2020 in sports describes the year's events in world sport. Many sporting events around the world have been postponed or cancelled because of the COVID-19 pandemic, including the 2020 Summer Olympics and Paralympics, which eventually took place in 2021.

Calendar by month

Air sports

Aeromodelling
 March 26 – 29: 2020 FAI F1D World Championship for Indoor Model Aircraft in  Slanic Prahova
 July 27 – August 1: 2020 FAI F4 World Championships for Scale Model Aircraft in  Tønsberg
 August 3 – 8: 2020 FAI F3J World Championship for Model Gliders in  Tekovsky Hradok
 August 10 – 15: 2020 FAI F2 World Championships for Control Line Model Aircraft in  Włocławek
 August 21 – 29: 2020 FAI S World Championships for Space Models in  Buzău
 September 12 – 19: 2020 FAI F5B World Championship for Electric Model Aircraft in  Dupnitsa
 October 5 – 10: 2020 FAI F3F World Championship for Model Gliders in  Limoux

Air Racing
 TBD: 2020 Air Race 1 World Cup (location TBA)
 TBD: 2020 Air Race E World Cup (locations TBA)

Ballooning
 August 11 – 15: 2020 FAI Women's World Hot Air Balloon Championship in  Nałęczów
 September 20 – 26: 2020 FAI World Hot Air Balloon Championship in  Murska Sobota

Drone racing
FAI World Drone Racing Championships
 TBD: FAI World Drone Racing Championships (location TBA)

FAI Drone Racing World Cup
 March 13: Race of Drones Oulu (WCC #1) in  Oulu
 May 16 & 17: Seoul Drone Race World Cup (WCC #2) in  Seoul
 May 16 & 17: MajFlaj (WCC #3) in  Skopje
 June 5 – 7: Drone World Cup El Yelmo (WCC #4) in  El Yelmo
 June 27 & 28: Drone Extreme Racing (WCC #5) in  Bela Crkva
 July 4 & 5: Partouche Drone Race II (WCC #6) in  Forges-les-Eaux
 July 11 & 12: World Cup Cubillos Del Sil (WCC #7) in  Cubillos del Sil
 July 17 & 19: Drone Race San Marino World Cup F9U (WCC #9) in  Serravalle
 July 25 & 26: Mitteldeutscher FPV Race Cup (WCC #10) in  Bitterfeld
 July 25 & 26: Belarus Drone Racing World Cup (WCC #11) in  Minsk
 August 29 & 30: F9U World Cup (WCC #12) in  RAF Barkston Heath
 September 5 & 6: F9U World Cup Italy (WCC #13) in  Magreta di Sassuolo
 September 5 & 6: PAM Cup (WCC #14) in  Plovdiv
 September 19 & 20: Daegu Drone Race World Cup (WCC #15) in  Daegu
 October 3 & 4: Danish Drone Nationals (WCC #16) in  Central Jutland
 October 10 & 11: Argentina Open World Cup F9U (WCC #17) in  Buenos Aires
 October 10: Dutch Drone Race World Cup (WCC #18) in  Assen
 October 10 & 11: Phoenix Drone Racing - Trophy of Prilep (WCC #19) in  Prilep

General aviation
 November 15 – 20: 2020 FAI World Air Navigation Race Championship in  Stellenbosch

Gliding
 January 3 – 18: 2020 FAI Women's World Gliding Championship in  Lake Keepit
 18 metre winner:  Mélanie Gadoulet
 Standard winner:  Sarah Arnold
 Club winner:  Elena Fergnani
 July 19 – 31: 2020 FAI World Gliding Championships in  Stendal (Open, 18 meter, 20 meter Multi-seat)
 August 8 – 22: 2020 FAI World Gliding Championships in  Écury-sur-Coole (15 meter, Standard, Club)

Parachuting
 August 8 – 22: 2020 World Parachuting Championships in  Novosibirsk

Alpine skiing

American football

 Super Bowl LIV – the Kansas City Chiefs (AFC) won 31–20 over the San Francisco 49ers (NFC)
Location: Hard Rock Stadium
Attendance: 62,417
MVP: Patrick Mahomes, QB (Kansas City)

Aquatics

2020 Summer Olympics (Aquatics)
 April 21 – 26: 2020 FINA Diving World Cup in  Tokyo
 April 30 – May 3: FINA Artistic Swimming Olympic Games Qualification Tournament 2020 in  Tokyo
 May 30 – 31: FINA Olympic Marathon Swim Qualifier 2020 in  Fukuoka

2020 Summer Paralympics (Swimming)

Archery

International and continental competitions
 March 23 – 29: 2020 Pan American Archery Championships in  Monterrey
 April 5 – 6: 2020 Oceanian Archery Championships in  Suva
 May 20 – 26: 2020 European Archery Championships in  Antalya

2020 Archery World Cup
 May 11 – 17: AWC #1 in  Antalya
 June 21 – 28: AWC #2 in  Berlin
 September 26 & 27: AWC #3 (final) in  Shanghai

Association football

2020 Summer Olympics (Association football)
 January 8 – 26: 2020 AFC U-23 Championship in 
  South Korea defeated  Saudi Arabia, 1 – 0. Third place:  Australia
 January 18 – February 9: 2020 CONMEBOL Pre-Olympic Tournament in 
  Argentina won the Final Stage.  Brazil take Second Place. Third place:  Uruguay
 January 28 – February 9: 2020 CONCACAF Women's Olympic Qualifying Championship in 
  United States defeated  Canada, 3 – 0.
 March 20 – April 1: 2020 CONCACAF Men's Olympic Qualifying Championship in  Guadalajara

FIFA
International
 August 10 – 30: 2020 FIFA U-20 Women's World Cup in  Costa Rica (Moved to 2021 due to COVID-19 pandemic)
 November 2 – 21: 2020 FIFA U-17 Women's World Cup in  India (Moved to 2021 due to COVID-19 pandemic)

Clubs
 TBD for December: 2020 FIFA Club World Cup in  Doha

UEFA
National teams
 September 3 – November 17: 2020-21 UEFA Nations League
 June 12 – July 12: UEFA Euro 2020 in 12 cities around  Europe

Clubs
 September 11, 2019 – August 30, 2020: 2019–20 UEFA Women's Champions League (final in  San Sebastián)
  Lyon defeated  VfL Wolfsburg, 3 – 1.
 September 17, 2019 – August 23, 2020: 2019–20 UEFA Champions League (final in  Lisbon)
  Bayern Munich defeated  Paris Saint-Germain, 1 – 0.
 September 19, 2019 – August 21, 2020: 2019–20 UEFA Europa League (final in  Cologne)
  Sevilla defeated  Inter Milan, 3 – 2.
 September 24, 2020: 2020 UEFA Super Cup in  Budapest
  Bayern Munich defeated  Sevilla, 2 – 1.

CONMEBOL
National teams

Clubs
 January 21 – November 21: 2020 Copa Libertadores (final in  Rio de Janeiro)
 February 4 – November 7: 2020 Copa Sudamericana (final in  Córdoba)
 TBD for May: 2020 Recopa Sudamericana (location TBA)
 TBD: 2020 Copa Libertadores Femenina (location TBA)

AFC
Clubs
 February 10 – November 7: 2020 AFC Cup
 February 10 – December 19: 2020 AFC Champions League
  Ulsan Hyundai defeated  Persepolis, 2 – 1.
 TBD: 2020 AFC Women's Club Championship

CAF
National teams
 April 4 – 25: 2020 African Nations Championship in 
 November 28 – December 12: 2020 Africa Women Cup of Nations (location TBA)

Clubs
 August 9, 2019 – October 25, 2020: 2019–20 CAF Confederation Cup
  RS Berkane defeated  Pyramids, 1 – 0.
 August 9, 2019 – May 30, 2020: 2019–20 CAF Champions League
  Al Ahly defeated  Zamalek, 2 – 1.
 TBD: 2020 CAF Super Cup

CONCACAF
National teams
 June: 2020 CONCACAF Nations League Final Round
Clubs
 February 18 – May 7: 2020 CONCACAF Champions League
  UANL defeated  Los Angeles FC, 2 – 1.
 July – November: 2020 CONCACAF League

OFC
National teams
 June 6 – 20: 2020 OFC Nations Cup (location TBA)

Clubs
 February 15 – May 16: 2020 OFC Champions League

Athletics

International and continental events
 June 24 – 28: 2020 African Championships in Athletics in  Algiers
 August 26 – 30: 2020 European Athletics Championships in  Paris
 August 28 – 30: 2020 NACAC Championships (location TBA)

World Marathon Majors
 March 1: 2020 Tokyo Marathon in  Tokyo
 September 14: 2020 Boston Marathon in  Boston
 September 27: 2020 Berlin Marathon in  Berlin
 October 4: 2020 London Marathon in  London
 October 11: 2020 Chicago Marathon in  Chicago
 November 1: 2020 New York City Marathon in  New York City

2020 Diamond League
 April 17: DL #1 in  Doha
 May 9: DL #2 in  Taohua Island
 May 16: DL #3 in  Shanghai
 May 24: DL #4 in  Stockholm
 May 28: DL #5 in  Rome
 May 31: DL #6 in  Rabat
 June 7: DL #7 in  Eugene
 June 11: DL #8 in  Oslo
 June 13: DL #9 in  Paris
 July 4 & 5: DL #10 in  London
 July 10: DL #11 in  Monaco
 August 16: DL #12 in  Gateshead
 August 20: DL #13 in  Lausanne
 September 4: DL #14 in  Brussels
 September 11: DL #15 (final) in  Zürich

2020 Race walking Challenge
 March 28: RWC #1 in  Taicang
 April 4: RWC #2 in  Rio Maior
 May 2 & 3: RWC #3 in  Minsk
 May 30: RWC #4 in  La Coruña
 October 18 & 20: RWC #5 (final) in  Suzhou

Aussie rules
 February 7 – March 29: 2020 AFL Women's season
 March 19 – August: 2020 AFL season
 April 18: 2020 AFL Women's Grand Final (location TBA)
 September 26: 2020 AFL Grand Final in  Melbourne
 November: 2020 International Rules Series in

Badminton

2020 International badminton events (Grade 1)
 May 16 – 24: 2020 Thomas & Uber Cup in  Aarhus
 December 9 – 13: 2020 BWF World Tour Finals in  Guangzhou

2020 Continental badminton events
 February 10 – 15: 2020 Oceania Badminton Championships (Senior, Junior, & Teams) in  Ballart
 Men's Singles:  Abhinav Manota
 Women's Singles:  Chen Hsuan-yu
 Men's Doubles:  Oliver Leydon-Davis / Abhinav Manota
 Women's Doubles:  Setyana Mapasa / Gronya Somerville
 Mixed Doubles:  Simon Leung / Gronya Somerville
 February 10 – 16: 2020 African Badminton Championships (Senior, Junior, & Teams) in  Cairo
 Men's Singles:  Georges Paul
 Women's Singles:  Kate Foo Kune
 Men's Doubles:  Koceila Mammeri / Youcef Sabri Medel
 Women's Doubles:  Doha Hany / Hadia Hosny
 Mixed Doubles:  Adham Hatem Elgamal / Doha Hany
 February 11 – 16: 2020 European Men's and Women's Team Badminton Championships in  Liévin
 Men's Team:  Denmark national badminton team
 Women's Team:  Denmark national badminton team
 February 11 – 16: 2020 Badminton Asia Team Championships in  Manila
 Men's Team:  Indonesia national badminton team
 Women's Team:  Japan national badminton team
 February 13 – 16: 2020 Pan Am Badminton Championships (Team) in  Salvador
 Men's Team:  Canada national badminton team
 Women's Team:  Canada national badminton team
 April 21 – 26: 2020 Badminton Asia Championships in  Wuhan
 April 23 – 26: 2020 Pan Am Badminton Championships in  Guatemala City

2020 BWF season (Grade 2)
 January 7 – November 29: 2020 BWF World Tour

Level Two (Super 1000)
 March 11 – 15: 2020 All England Open in  Birmingham
 June 16 – 21: 2020 Indonesia Open in  Jakarta
 September 15 – 20: 2020 China Open in  Changzhou

Bandy

 March 29 – April 5: 2020 Bandy World Championship in  Irkutsk
 February 19 – 22: 2020 Women's Bandy World Championship in  Oslo
  Sweden women's national bandy team
 TBD for October: 2020 Bandy World Cup (location TBA)

Baseball

2020 Summer Olympics (Baseball)
 March 22 – 26: Americas Qualifying Event in  Arizona
 April 1 – 5: Final Qualifying Tournament in

International and continental events
 TBD for March: 2020 South American Baseball Championship in  Tocopilla
 TBD: 2020 Women's Baseball World Cup (location TBA)

Major League Baseball
 July 23 – September 27: 2020 Major League Baseball season
 American League regular season winners:  Tampa Bay Rays
 National League regular season winners:  Los Angeles Dodgers
 June 10 – 12: 2020 College World Series in  Omaha
 College World Series cancelled March 13, 2020 due to COVID-19 pandemic.
 July 14: 2020 Major League Baseball All-Star Game in  Los Angeles
 All-Star Game cancelled.
 October 20 – 27: 2020 World Series
 The  Los Angeles Dodgers defeated the  Tampa Bay Rays, 4–2 in games played, to win their seventh World Series title.

Caribbean Series
 February 1 – 7: 2020 Caribbean Series in  San Juan
  Toros del Este defeated  Cardenales de Lara, 9 – 3. Third place:  Tomateros de Culiacán

CEB
 June: 2020 European Champions Cup in  Ostrava

Basketball

2020 Summer Olympics (Basketball)
 February 6 – 9: 2020 FIBA Women's Olympic Qualifying Tournaments #1 in  Ostend
  and  qualified for the 2020 Summer Olympics
 February 6 – 9: 2020 FIBA Women's Olympic Qualifying Tournaments #2 and #4 in  Belgrade
 February 6 – 9: 2020 FIBA Women's Olympic Qualifying Tournaments #3 in  Bourges

2020 Summer Paralympics (Wheelchair basketball)

FIBA
 February 7 – 9: 2020 FIBA Intercontinental Cup in  San Cristóbal de La Laguna
  Iberostar Tenerife defeated  Virtus Pallacanestro Bologna, 80 – 72. Third place  San Lorenzo de Almagro

FIBA Europe
 September 17, 2019 – May 2: 2019–20 Basketball Champions League
 September 26, 2019 – April 15: 2019–20 EuroCup Women
 September 25, 2019 – April 19: 2019–20 EuroLeague Women
 October 1, 2019 – April 29: 2019–20 EuroCup Basketball
 October 2, 2019 – April 29: 2019–20 FIBA Europe Cup
 October: 2020 FIBA Europe SuperCup Women

FIBA Africa
 March – May 2020: 2020 BAL season
 TBD: 2020 FIBA Africa Women's Clubs Champions Cup (location TBA)

FIBA Asia
 TBD: 2020 FIBA Asia Champions Cup (location TBA)

FIBA Americas
 October 28, 2019 – March 14, 2020: 2019-20 BCLA season
 TBD: 2020 South American Women's Club Championship

National Basketball Association
 October 22, 2019 – April 15, 2020: 2019–20 NBA season, suspended on March 11, 2020; ending the season prematurely
 February 16: 2020 NBA All-Star Game in  Chicago
 All-Star Game:  Team LeBron defeated Team Giannis, 157 – 155.
 Celebrity Game:  Team Wilbon defeated Team Stephen, 62 – 47.
 Rising Stars Challenge:  Team USA defeated Team World, 151 – 131.
 Skills Challenge:  Bam Adebayo  defeated Domantas Sabonis 
 Three Point Contest: Buddy Hield 
 Slam Dunk Contest: Derrick Jones Jr. 
 August 17, 2020 – October 11, 2020: 2020 NBA playoffs
 The  Los Angeles Lakers defeated the  Miami Heat, 4–2 in games played, to win their seventeenth NBA title.
 June 25: 2020 NBA draft in  Brooklyn

WNBA
 April 17: 2020 WNBA draft, held virtually due to the COVID-19 pandemic in the United States
 #1 pick:  Sabrina Ionescu from the  Oregon Ducks to the  New York Liberty.
 July – October: 2020 WNBA season
 September 15 - October 6: 2020 WNBA Playoffs

FIBA 3X3
 June 26 – 28: 2020 FIBA 3x3 Europe Cup in  Antwerp
 TBD: 2020 FIBA 3x3 Asia Cup in  Changsha
 TBD: 2020 FIBA 3x3 Africa Cup (location TBA)

FIBA 3x3 World Tour
 April 10 & 11: 3x3 WT #1 in  Doha
 May 30 & 31: 3x3 WT #2 in  Chengdu
 August 1 & 2: 3x3 WT #3 in  Prague
 August 21 & 22: 3x3 WT #4 in  Lausanne
 August 29 & 30: 3x3 WT #5 in  Debrecen
 November 14 – 20: 3x3 WT #6 (Final) in  Los Angeles

Beach volleyball

2020 Summer Olympics (Beach volleyball)
 June 22 – 28: 2018–2020 AVC Beach Volleyball Continental Cup Final
 June 22 – 28: 2018–2020 CAVB Beach Volleyball Continental Cup Final
 June 22 – 28: 2018–2020 CEV Beach Volleyball Continental Cup Final in  Eindhoven
 June 22 – 28: 2018–2020 CSV Beach Volleyball Continental Cup
 June 22 – 28: 2018–2020 NORCECA Beach Volleyball Continental Cup

International and continental events
 15–20 September: 2020 European Beach Volleyball Championship
 TBD: 2020 Asian Beach Volleyball Championship
 TBD: 2020 CAVB Beach Volleyball Nations Cup
 TBD: 2020 NORCECA Circuit
 TBD: 2020 CSVP Circuit

2020 FIVB Beach Volleyball World Tour
 TBD: FIVB World Tour Finals (location TBA)

2020 World Tour Five Star BV events
 June 10 – 14: Five Star #1 in  Rome
 July 7 – 12: Five Star #2 in  Gstaad
 August 12 – 16: Five Star #3 in  Vienna
 August 19 – 23: Five Star #4 in  Hamburg

Biathlon

Bobsleigh & Skeleton

Boules

Boccia

2020 Summer Paralympics

Boule Lyonnaise
 September 23 – 26: 2020 Women's Boule Lyonnaise World Championships in  Alassio

Pétanque
 July 16 – 19: 2020 Petanque World Championships in  Lausanne

Boxing

Canadian football

Canoeing

2020 Summer Olympics (Canoeing)
 March 26 – 29: 2020 Canoe Sprint Asian Olympic Qualifier in  Pattaya
 May 6 & 7: 2020 Canoe Sprint European Olympic Qualifier in  Račice
 May 21 – 24: 2020 ICF Canoe Sprint Final Olympic Qualifier in  Duisburg

2020 Summer Paralympics (Paracanoeing)
 May 21 – 24: 2020 ICF Paracanoe World Championships & Paralympic Qualifier in  Duisburg

Cheerleading
 April 27 – 29: 2020 ICU World Cheerleading Championships (location TBA)

Chess

International events
 March 15 – April 5: Candidates Tournament 2020 in  Yekaterinburg
 August 5 – 18: 44th Chess Olympiad in  Khanty-Mansiysk
 January 4 – 24: Women's World Chess Championship 2020 in  Shanghai and  Vladivostok
 Ju Wenjun defeated  Aleksandra Goryachkina, 6 (2½) – 6 (1½).

FIDE Women's Grand Prix 2019–20
 September 10 – 23, 2019: WGP #1 in  Skolkovo winner:  Humpy Koneru
 December 2 – 15, 2019: WGP #2 in  Monaco winners:  Alexandra Kosteniuk,  Humpy Koneru,  Aleksandra Goryachkina (tie)
 March 1 – 14: WGP #3 in  Lausanne winners:  Nana Dzagnidze &  Aleksandra Goryachkina (tie)
 May 2 – 15: WGP #4 (final) in

Cricket

World Cups
 February 21 – March 8: 2020 ICC Women's T20 World Cup in 
 Australia defeated  India  184/4 (20 overs) – 99 (19.1 overs)
2020 ICC Men's T20 World Cup in  : Postponed.

Cross-country skiing

Cue sports

Curling

2019–20 International curling championships
 October 12 – 19, 2019: 2019 World Mixed Curling Championship in  Aberdeen
  (Skip: Colin Kurz) defeated  (Skip: Andy Kapp), 6–5, to win Canada's second consecutive World Mixed Curling Championship title.
  (Skip: Ingvild Skaga) took third place.
 November 2 – 9, 2019: 2019 Pacific-Asia Curling Championships in  Shenzhen
 Men:  (Skip: Kim Chang-min) defeated  (Skip: Yuta Matsumura), 11–2, to win South Korea's fourth Men's Pacific-Asia Curling Championships title.
  (Skip: Zou Qiang) took third place.
 Women:  (Skip: Han Yu) defeated  (Skip: Seina Nakajima), 10–3, to win China's eighth Women's Pacific-Asia Curling Championships title.
  (Skip: Gim Un-chi) took third place.
 November 16 – 23, 2019: 2019 European Curling Championships in  Helsingborg
 Men:  (Skip: Niklas Edin) defeated  (Skip: Yannick Schwaller), 9–3, to win Sweden's 11th Men's European Curling Championships title.
 Women:  (Skip: Anna Hasselborg) defeated  (Skip: Eve Muirhead), 5–4, to win Sweden's 21st Women's European Curling Championships title.
  (Skip: Silvana Tirinzoni) took third place.
 November 28 – 30, 2019: 2019 Americas Challenge in  Eveleth
 Men: Champion:  (Skip: Rich Ruohonen); Second:  (Skip: Ramy Cohen Masri); Third:  (Skip: Michael Krahenbuhl)
 Women: Champion:  (Skip: Tabitha Peterson); Second:  (Skip: Adriana Camarena Osorno); Third:  (Skip: Anne Shibuya)
 December 2 – 7, 2019: 2019 World Mixed Doubles Qualification Event in  Howwood
 January 13 – 18: 2020 World Qualification Event in  Lohja
 Men:  China and  Russia has been qualified to 2020 World Men's Curling Championship
 Women:  South Korea and  Italy has been qualified to 2020 World Women's Curling Championship
 February 29 – March 7: 2020 World Wheelchair Curling Championship in  Wetzikon
Champion:  (Skip: Konstantin Kurokhtin); Second:  (Skip: Mark Ideson); Third:  (Skip: Viljo Petersson-Dahl)
 March 14 – 22: 2020 World Women's Curling Championship in  Prince George
 March 28 – April 5: 2020 World Men's Curling Championship in  Glasgow
 April 18 – 25: 2020 World Mixed Doubles Curling Championship in  Kelowna

2019–20 World Curling Tour & Grand Slam of Curling
 June 15, 2019 – May 3, 2020: 2019–20 World Curling Tour and Grand Slam of Curling Seasons
 October 22 – 27, 2019: 2019 Masters in  North Bay
 Men: Team  Matt Dunstone defeated Team  Brad Gushue, 8–5, to win Saskatchewan's second Men's Masters title.
 Women: Team  Tracy Fleury defeated Team  Sayaka Yoshimura, 7–5, to win Manitoba's second Women's Masters title.
 November 5 – 10, 2019: 2019 Tour Challenge in  Pictou County
 Men: Team  Brad Jacobs defeated Team  Brad Gushue, 6–4, to win Ontario's second consecutive Men's Tour Challenge title.
 Women: Team  Anna Hasselborg defeated Team  Kerri Einarson, 8–5, to win Sweden's first Women's Tour Challenge title.
 December 10 – 15, 2019: 2019 National in  Conception Bay South
 Men: Team  Brad Jacobs defeated Team  Niklas Edin, 3–1.
 Women: Team  Anna Hasselborg defeated Team  Jennifer Jones, 7–3.
 January 14 – 19: 2020 Canadian Open in  Yorkton
 Men: Team  Brad Jacobs defeated Team  John Epping, 6–5.
 Women: Team  Anna Hasselborg defeated Team  Kim Min-ji, 7–5.
 April 7 – 12: 2020 Players' Championship in  Toronto
 April 29 – May 3: 2020 Champions Cup in  Olds

Cycle ball

World cup

 February 29: UCI Artistic Cycling World Cup #1 in  Koblach
Mixed Artistic Cycling ACT4 Winner:  Germany
Women Pair Artistic Cycling Women Winner:  Germany
Mixed Pair Artistic Cycling Mix Winner:  Germany
Men Single Artistic Cycling Men Winner:  Lukas Kohl
Women Single Artistic Cycling Women Winner:  Maren Hasse
 April 4: UCI Cycle-ball World Cup #1 in  Winterthur
 April 25: UCI Cycle-ball World Cup #2 in  Wendlingen
 June 20: UCI Cycle-ball World Cup #3 in  Svitávka
 June 27: UCI Artistic Cycling World Cup #2 in  Komárno
 September 5: UCI Cycle-ball World Cup #4 in  Dornbirn
 September 19: UCI Cycle-ball World Cup #5 in  Hardt
 October 10: UCI Cycle-ball World Cup #6 in  St. Gallen
 October 31: UCI Cycle-ball World Cup #7 in  Sangerhausen
 November 21: UCI Artistic Cycling World Cup (final) in  Erlenbach
 December 5: UCI Cycle-ball World Cup (final) in  Prague

International competitions
 July 4 & 5: Champions Cup in  Osaka
 August 1: 15th Asian Indoor Cycling Championships in 
 November 21: 2020 U23 Cycle-ball European Championship in  Mosnang
 November 27 – 29: UCI Indoor Cycling World Championships - Cycle-ball in  Stuttgart
 November 27 – 29: UCI Indoor Cycling World Championships - Artistic Cycling in  Stuttgart

Cycling — BMX

International BMX events
 May 26 – 31: 2020 UCI BMX World Championships in  Houston

2020 UCI BMX Supercross World Cup
 February 1 & 2: SCWC #1 & #2 in  Shepparton
Men Elite Winner:  Niek Kimmann (#1) &  Connor Fields (#2)
Women Elite Winner:  Alise Willoughby (#1 & #2)
 February 8 & 9: SCWC #3 & #4 in  Bathurst
Men Elite Winner:   Connor Fields (#3 & #4)
 April 18 & 19: SCWC #5 & #6 in  Manchester
 May 2 & 3: SCWC #7 & #8 in  Papendal
 May 16 & 17: SCWC #9 & #10 (final) in  Rock Hill

Cycling – Cyclo-cross

2019–20 International Cyclo-cross events
 November 9 & 10, 2019: 2019 Pan American Cyclo-cross Championships in  Midland
 Elite winners:  Kerry Werner (m) /  Maghalie Rochette (f)
 Juniors winners:  Andrew Strohmeyer (m) /  Madigan Munro (f)
 U23 winners:  Gage Hecht (m) /  Ruby West (f)
 November 9 & 10, 2019: 2019 UEC Cyclo-cross European Championships in  Silvelle
 Elite winners:  Mathieu van der Poel (m) /  Yara Kastelijn (f)
 Juniors winners:  Thibau Nys (m) /  Puck Pieterse (f)
 U23 winners:  Mickael Crispin (m) /  Ceylin del Carmen Alvarado (f)
 November 29 & 30, 2019: 2019 UCI Masters Cyclo-cross World Championships in  Mol
 35–39 years winners:  Eddy van IJzendoorn (m) /  Viviane Rognant (f)
 40–44 years winners:  Thibaut Vassal (m) /  Kate Eedy (f)
 45–49 years winners:  Arne Daelmans (m) /  Cindy Bauwens (f)
 50–54 years winners:  Erik Dekker (m) /  Marianne Van Leeuwen (f)
 55–59 years winners:  Dirk Mertens (m) /  Suzie Godart (f)
 60–64 years winners:  Marc Verloo (m) /  Nicola Davies (f)
 65–69 years winners:  Dave McMullen (m) /  Patricia Konantz (f)
 Men's 70–74 years winner:  Jean Bernard Galissaire
 70+ years winners:  Victor Barnett (m) /  Julie Lockhart (f)
 February 1 & 2: 2020 UCI Cyclo-cross World Championships in  Dübendorf
 Men's elite race:  Mathieu van der Poel
 Men's under-23 race:  Ryan Kamp
 Men's junior race:  Thibau Nys
 Women's elite race:  Ceylin del Carmen Alvarado
 Women's under-23 race:  Marion Norbert-Riberolle
 Women's junior race:  Shirin van Anrooij

2019–20 UCI Cyclo-cross World Cup
 September 14, 2019: CCWC #1 in  Iowa City
 Elite winners:  Eli Iserbyt (m) /  Maghalie Rochette (f)
 September 22, 2019: CCWC #2 in  Waterloo
 Elite winners:  Eli Iserbyt (m) /  Kateřina Nash (f)
 October 20, 2019: CCWC #3 in  Bern
 Elite winners:  Eli Iserbyt (m) /  Annemarie Worst (f)
 Men's Junior winner:  Thibau Nys
 Men's U23 winner:  Kevin Kuhn
 November 16, 2019: CCWC #4 in  Tábor
 Elite winners:  Mathieu van der Poel (m) /  Annemarie Worst (f)
 Men's Junior winner:  Thibau Nys
 Men's U23 winner:  Thomas Mein
 November 24, 2019: CCWC #5 in  Koksijde
 Elite winners:  Mathieu van der Poel (m) /  Ceylin del Carmen Alvarado (f)
 Men's Junior winner:  Thibau Nys
 Men's U23 winner:  Niels Vandeputte
 December 22, 2019: CCWC #6 in  Namur
 Elite winners:  Mathieu van der Poel (m) /  Lucinda Brand (f)
 Men's Junior winner:  Thibau Nys
 Men's U23 winner:  Kevin Kuhn
 December 26, 2019: CCWC #7 in  Heusden-Zolder
 Elite winners:  Mathieu van der Poel (m) /  Lucinda Brand (f)
 Men's Junior winner:  Thibau Nys
 Men's U23 winner:  Kevin Kuhn
 January 19: CCWC #8 in  Nommay
 Men's elite race:  Eli Iserbyt
 Men's under-23 race:  Ryan Kamp
 Women's elite race:  Annemarie Worst
 Women's under-23 race:  Thibau Nys
 January 26: CCWC #9 (final) in  Hoogerheide
 Men's elite race:  Mathieu van der Poel
 Men's under-23 race:  Ryan Kamp
 Women's elite race:  Lucinda Brand
 Women's under-23 race:  Dario Lillo

2019–20 Cyclo-cross Superprestige
 October 13, 2019: CCS #1 in  Gieten
 Elite winners:  Eli Iserbyt (m) /  Ceylin del Carmen Alvarado (f)
 Men's Junior winner:  Thibau Nys
 October 19, 2019: CCS #2 in  Boom
 Elite winners:  Toon Aerts (m) /  Alice Maria Arzuffi (f)
 Men's Junior winner:  Yorben Lauryssen
 October 27, 2019: CCS #3 in  Gavere
 Elite winners:  Eli Iserbyt (m) /  Yara Kastelijn (f)
 Men's Junior winner:  Thibau Nys
 November 3, 2019: CCS #4 in  Oostkamp-Ruddervoorde
 Elite winners:  Mathieu van der Poel (m) /  Ceylin del Carmen Alvarado (f)
 Men's Junior winner:  Jente Michels
 December 8, 2019: CCS #5 in  Zonhoven
 Elite winners:  Toon Aerts (m) /  Annemarie Worst (f)
 Men's Junior winner:  Thibau Nys
 December 29, 2019: CCS #6 in  Diegem
 Elite winners:  Mathieu van der Poel (m) /  Annemarie Worst (f)
 Men's Junior winner:  Thibau Nys
 February 9: CCS #7 in  Merksplas
 Cancelled
 February 15: CCS #8 (final) in  Middelkerke
 Elite winners:   Laurens Sweeck (m) / Ceylin del Carmen Alvarado (f)

2019–20 DVV Trophy
 November 1, 2019: DVV #1 in  Melden-Oudenaarde
 Elite winners:  Eli Iserbyt (m) /  Yara Kastelijn (f)
 Men's Junior winner:  Arne Baers
 Men's U23 winner:  Jens Dekker
 November 17, 2019: DVV #2 in  Hamme
 Elite winners:  Mathieu van der Poel (m) /  Annemarie Worst (f)
 Men's Junior winner:  Victor van de Putte
 Men's U23 winner:  Niels Vandeputte
 November 30, 2019: DVV #3 in  Kortrijk
 Elite winners:  Mathieu van der Poel (m) /  Lucinda Brand (f)
 Men's Junior winner:  Thibau Nys
 Men's U23 winner:  Niels Vandeputte
 December 14, 2019: DVV #4 in  Ronse-Kluisbergen
 Elite winners:  Toon Aerts (m) /  Ceylin del Carmen Alvarado (f)
 Men's U23 winner:  Ryan Kamp
 Men's Junior winner:  Yorben Lauryssen
 December 27, 2019: DVV #5 in  Loenhout
 Elite winners:  Mathieu van der Poel (m) /  Ceylin del Carmen Alvarado (f)
 Men's U23 winner:  Loris Rouiller
 Men's Junior winner:  Tibor Del Grosso
 January 1: DVV #6 in  Baal
 Elite winners:  Mathieu van der Poel (m) /  Ceylin del Carmen Alvarado (f)
 Men's U23 winner:  Antoine Benoist
 Junior winners:  Thibau Nys (m) /  Madigan Munro (f)
 January 5: DVV #7 in  Brussels
 Elite winners:  Mathieu van der Poel (m) /  Ceylin del Carmen Alvarado (f)
 Men's U23 winner:  Ryan Kamp
 Junior winners:  Lennert Belmans (m) /  Fem Van Empel (f)
 February 8: DVV #8 (final) in  Lille
 Elite winners:  Wout Van Aert (m) /  Ceylin del Carmen Alvarado (f)
 Men's U23 winner:  Niels Vandeputte
 Men's Junior winners:  Thibau Nys

Cycling – Mountain Bike

International mountain biking events
 May 14 – 17: 2020 European Continental Championships (XCE, XCO, & XCR) in  Graz
 June 25 – 28: 2020 UCI Mountain Bike World Championships (XCO & XCR) in  Albstadt
 September 5 & 6: 2020 UCI Mountain Bike World Championships (DHI only) in  Leogang
 September 10 & 11: 2020 UCI Mountain Bike World Championships (4X only) in  Val di Sole
 September 26 & 27: 2020 UCI Mountain Bike Marathon World Championships in  Sakarya Province

2020 UCI Mountain Bike World Cup
 March 21 & 22: MBWC #1 (DHI only) in  Lousã
 May 2 & 3: MBWC #2 (DHI only) in  Maribor
 May 9 & 10: MBWC #3 (DHI only) in  Lošinj
 May 22 – 24: MBWC #4 (XCO & XCC) in  Nové Město na Moravě
 June 6 & 7: MBWC #5 (DHI only) in  Fort William
 June 19 – 21: MBWC #6 (XCO, XCC, & DHI) in  Vallnord-Pal Arinsal
 August 14 – 16: MBWC #7 (XCO & XCC) in  Lenzerheide
 August 21 – 23: MBWC #8 (XCO, XCC, & DHI) in  Mont-Sainte-Anne
 September 11 – 13: MBWC #9 (XCO, XCC, & DHI) in  Val di Sole
 September 18 – 20: MBWC #10 (XCO, XCC, & DHI) in  Les Gets

Cycling – Road

2020 Grand Tour events
 August 29 – September 20: 2020 Tour de France
 October 3 – 25: 2020 Giro d'Italia
 October 20 – November 8: 2020 Vuelta a España

2020 UCI World Tour
 January 21 – 26:  Tour Down Under
 
 February 2:  Great Ocean Road Race
 
 February 23 – 29:  UAE Tour

 February 29:  Omloop Het Nieuwsblad

 March 8 – 14:  Paris–Nice

2020 UCI Women's World Tour
 March 7:  2020 Strade Bianche Women
Postponed to the COVID-19 pandemic
 March 15:  2020 Ronde van Drenthe
 March 22:  2020 Trofeo Alfredo Binda-Comune di Cittiglio
 March 26:  2020 Three Days of Bruges–De Panne
 March 29:  2020 Gent–Wevelgem

Cycling – Track

International track cycling events
 October 17 – 21, 2019: 2020 Asian Track Cycling Championships in 
 Sprint winners:  Azizulhasni Awang (m) /  Lee Wai Sze (f)
 Keirin winners:  Yuta Wakimoto (m) /  Lee Wai Sze (f)
 Individual pursuit winners:  Park Sang-hoon (m) /  Lee Ju-mi (f)
 Points race winners:  Kim Eu-ro (m) /  Olga Zabelinskaya (f)
 Scratch winners:  Mow Ching Yin (m) /  Kie Furuyama (f)
 Omnium winners:  Eiya Hashimoto (m) /  Yumi Kajihara (f)
 Madison winners:  Shin Dong-in & Kim Eu-ro (m) /  Yang Qianyu & Pang Yao (f)
 Men's 1 km time trial winner:  Andrey Chugay
 Women's 500 m time trial winner:  Chen Feifei
 Team sprint winners:  (m) /  (f)
 Team pursuit winners:  (m) /  (f)
 January 16 – 19: CAC Track African Championships in  Cairo
 Sprint winners:  Jean Spies (m) /  Charlene Du Preez (f)
 Keirin winners:  Jean Spies (m) /  Charlene Du Preez (f)
 Individual pursuit winners:  Lotfi Tchambaz (m) /  Ebtissam Zayed Ahmed (f)
 Points race winners:  David Maree (m) /  Ebtissam Zayed Ahmed (f)
 Scratch winners:  Joshua Van Wyk (m) /  Ebtissam Zayed Ahmed (f)
 Omnium winners:  David Maree (m) /  Ebtissam Zayed Ahmed (f)
 Madison winners:  Joshua Van Wyk & Steven Van Heerden (m) /  Danielle Van Niekerk & Ilze Bole (f)
 Men's 1 km time trial winner:  Jean Spies
 Women's 500 m time trial winner:   Charlene Du Preez
 Team sprint winners:  (m) /  (f)
 Team pursuit winners:  (m) /  (f)
 February 26 – March 1: 2020 UCI Track Cycling World Championships in  Berlin
Sprint winners:  Harrie Lavreysen (m) /  Emma Hinze (f)
 Keirin winners: Harrie Lavreysen (m) /  Emma Hinze (f)
 Individual pursuit winners:  Filippo Ganna (m) /  Chloé Dygert Owen
 Points race winners:  Corbin Strong (m) /  Elinor Barker (f)
 Scratch winners:  Yauheni Karaliok /  Kirsten Wild (f)
 Omnium winners:  Benjamin Thomas (m) /  Yumi Kajihara(f)
 Madison winners:  (Lasse Norman Hansen & Michael Mørkøv) (m) /  (Kirsten Wild & Amy Pieters) (f)
 Men's 1 km time trial winner:  Sam Ligtlee
 Women's 500 m time trial winner:   Lea Friedrich
 Team sprint winners:  (m) /  (f)
 Team pursuit winners:  (m) /   (f)

2019–20 UCI Track Cycling World Cup
 November 1 – 3, 2019: TCWC #1 in  Minsk
 Keirin winners:  Harrie Lavreysen (m) /  Emma Hinze (f)
 Madison winners:  (Lasse Norman Hansen & Michael Mørkøv) (m) /  (Kirsten Wild & Amy Pieters) (f)
 Omnium winners:  Matthew Walls (m) /  Jennifer Valente (f)
 Points Race winners:  Mark Stewart /  Jennifer Valente (f)
 Scratch winners:  Yauheni Karaliok /  Kirsten Wild (f)
 Sprint winners:  Harrie Lavreysen (m) /  Lee Wai Sze (f)
 Men's Elite Individual Pursuit winner:  Filippo Ganna
 Men's Team Pursuit winners:  (Rasmus Pedersen, Lasse Norman Hansen, Julius Johansen, & Frederik Rodenberg)
 Men's Team Sprint winners:  (Nils van 't Hoenderdaal, Harrie Lavreysen, & Jeffrey Hoogland)
 Women's Team Pursuit winners:  (Jennifer Valente, Chloé Dygert Owen, Emma White, & Christina Birch)
 Women's Team Sprint winners:  (Ekaterina Rogovaya & Daria Shmeleva)
 November 8 – 10, 2019: TCWC #2 in  Glasgow
 Keirin winners:  Sébastien Vigier (m) /  Katy Marchant (f)
 Madison winners:  Benjamin Thomas & Donavan Grondin (m) /  (Annette Edmondson & Georgia Baker) (f)
 Omnium winners:  Benjamin Thomas (m) /  Kirsten Wild (f)
 Scratch winners:  Felix English (m) /  Karolina Karasiewicz (f)
 Sprint winners:  Harrie Lavreysen (m) /  Lee Wai Sze (f)
 Men's Team Pursuit winners:  (Rasmus Pedersen, Lasse Norman Hansen, Julius Johansen, Frederik Rodenberg)
 Men's Team Sprint winners:  (Nils van 't Hoenderdaal, Harrie Lavreysen, Jeffrey Hoogland)
 Women's Team Pursuit winners:  (Ellie Dickinson, Neah Evans, Elinor Barker, Katie Archibald)
 Women's Team Sprint winners:  (Ekaterina Rogovaya, Daria Shmeleva)
 November 29 – December 1, 2019: TCWC #3 in 
 Keirin winners:  Callum Saunders (m) /  Lee Hye-jin (f)
 Madison winners:  (Roger Kluge & Theo Reinhardt (m) /  (Julie Leth & Trine Schmidt) (f)
 Omnium winners:  Campbell Stewart (m) /  Yumi Kajihara (f)
 Scratch winners:  Roy Eefting (m) /  Anita Stenberg (f)
 Sprint winners:  Harrie Lavreysen (m) /  Lee Wai Sze (f)
 Men's Team Pursuit winners:  (Felix Groß, Leon Rohde, Domenic Weinstein, Theo Reinhardt)
 Men's Team Sprint winners:  (Roy van den Berg, Harrie Lavreysen, Jeffrey Hoogland)
 Women's Team Pursuit winners:  (Ally Wollaston, Emily Shearman, Michaela Drummond, Nicole Shields)
 Women's Team Sprint winners:  (Pauline Grabosch, Emma Hinze)
 December 6 – 8, 2019: TCWC #4 in  Cambridge
Keirin winners:  Azizulhasni Awang  (m) /   Lee Hye-jin (f)
 Madison winners:  (Aaron Gate & Campbell Stewartt) (m) /  (Annette Edmondson & Georgia Baker) (f)
 Omnium winners:  Campbell Stewart (m) /  Yumi Kajihara (f)
 Scratch winners:  Roman Gladysh (m) /  Holly Edmondston (f)
 Sprint winners:   Mateusz Rudyk (m) /   Anastasia Voynova  (f)
 Men's Team Pursuit winners:  (Robin Froidevaux, Claudio Imhof, Stefan Bissegger, Lukas Rüegg, Mauro Schmid)
 Men's Team Sprint winners:  (Kazuki Amagai, Tomohiro Fukaya, Yudai Nitta)
 Women's Team Pursuit winners:   (Rushlee Buchanan, Holly Edmondston, Bryony Botha, Kirstie James & Jaime Nielsen)
 Women's Team Sprint winners:  (Natasha Hansen & Olivia Podmore)
 December 13 – 15, 2019: TCWC #5 in  Brisbane
 January 24 – 26: TCWC #6 (final) in  Milton

Darts

Professional Darts Corporation
 December 13, 2019 – January 1: 2020 PDC World Darts Championship in  London
  Peter Wright beat  Michael van Gerwen, 7–3
 January 31 – February 2: 2020 Masters in  Milton Keynes
  Peter Wright beat  Michael Smith, 11–10
  Glen Durrant beat  Nathan Aspinall, 11–8
 March 6 – 8: 2020 UK Open in  Minehead
  Michael van Gerwen beat  Gerwyn Price, 11–9
 July 18 – 26: 2020 World Matchplay in  Milton Keynes
  Dimitri Van den Bergh beat  Gary Anderson, 18–10
 September 5 – 6 : 2020 Champions League of Darts in  Leicester
Cancelled
 September 18 – 20: 2020 World Series of Darts Finals in  Salzburg
  Gerwyn Price beat  Rob Cross, 11–9
 October 6 – 12: 2020 World Grand Prix in  Coventry
  Gerwyn Price beat  Dirk van Duijvenbode, 5–2
 October 29 – November 1: 2020 European Championship in  Oberhausen
  Peter Wright beat  James Wade 11–4
 November 6 – 8: 2020 PDC World Cup of Darts in  Salzburg
  beat , 3–0
 November 16 – 24: 2020 Grand Slam of Darts in  Coventry
  José de Sousa beat  James Wade, 16–12
 November 27 – 29: 2020 Players Championship Finals in  Coventry
  Michael van Gerwen beat  Mervyn King, 11–10
 November 29: 2020 PDC World Youth Championship Final in  Coventry

British Darts Organisation
 January 4 – 12: 2020 BDO World Darts Championship in  London
 Men:  Wayne Warren beat  Jim Williams, 7–4
 Women:  Mikuru Suzuki beat  Lisa Ashton, 3–0
 August 28 – 30: 2020 World Trophy in  Blackburn
 Cancelled
 October 23 – 25: 2020 World Masters in  Purfleet
 Cancelled

Equestrianism

2020 Summer Olympics (Equestrianism)

2020 Summer Paralympics (Equestrianism)

2019–20 FEI World Cup Jumping
 April 4, 2019 – November 24, 2019: 2019 FEI World Cup Jumping – South League
 Winner:  José Roberto Reynoso Fernandez Filho with horse Azrael W
 April 18, 2019 – December 1, 2019: 2019 FEI World Cup Jumping –  League
 Winner:  Masami Kawaguchi with horse Samurai Blue
 April 25, 2019 – November 10, 2019: 2019 FEI World Cup Jumping – Central Asian League
 Winner:  Gairat Nazarov with horse Quatro Junior
 April 28, 2019 – October 7, 2019: 2019 FEI World Cup Jumping –  League
 Winner:  Jirigala Erdeng with horse Brikibo Vd Bosbeek
 May 2, 2019 – February 7, 2020: 2019–20 FEI World Cup Jumping – Caucasus-Caspian League
 May 2, 2019 – March 15, 2020: 2019–20 FEI World Cup Jumping – Central European League
 North CEL winner:
 South CEL winner:
 March 12 – 15: 2020 Central European League Final in  Warsaw
 Winner:
 Overall winner:
 May 8, 2019 – October 27, 2019: 2019 FEI World Cup Jumping –  South African League
 Winner:  Christopher Van Der Merwe with horse Chantilly
 July 12, 2019 – November 10, 2019: 2019 FEI World Cup Jumping – South East Asian League
 Winner:  Jaruporn Limpichati with horse Irregular Choice
 July 27, 2019 – February 2, 2020: 2019–20 FEI World Cup Jumping –  Australian League
 August 20, 2019 – March 8, 2020: 2019–20 FEI World Cup Jumping – North American League
 Western winner:
 Eastern winner:
 October 3, 2019 – February 8, 2020: 2019–20 FEI World Cup Jumping –  Arab League
 North African winner:
 Middle East winner:
 October 16, 2019 – February 23, 2020: 2019–20 FEI World Cup Jumping –  Western European League
 October 25, 2019 – January 5, 2020: 2019–20 FEI World Cup Jumping –  League

2019–20 FEI World Cup Dressage
 March 22, 2019 – December 15, 2019: 2019 FEI World Cup Dressage –  Pacific League
 Winner:  Wendi Williamson with horse Don Amour MH
 April 10, 2019 – April 26, 2020: 2019–20 FEI World Cup Dressage – North American League
 April 17, 2019 – April 26, 2020: 2019–20 FEI World Cup Dressage – Central European League
 October 16, 2019 – March 15, 2020: 2019–20 FEI World Cup Dressage –  Western European League

2020 Show Jumping World Cup and Dressage World Cup Finals
 April 15 – 19: 2020 FEI World Cup Show Jumping and Dressage Finals in  Las Vegas

Fencing

Field hockey

2020 Summer Olympics (Field hockey)

Figure skating

Figure skating at the 2020 Winter Youth Olympics
January 10 – 15: in  Lausanne
 Men:  Yuma Kagiyama
 Ladies:  You Young
 Pairs:  Apollinariia Panfilova & Dmitry Rylov
 Ice Dancing:  Irina Khavronina & Dario Chirizano
 Mixed NOC Teams:
  Arlet Levandi (Men)
 Ksenia Sinitsyna (Ladies)
 Alina Butaeva / Luka Berulava (Pairs)
 Utana Yoshida / Shingo Nishiyama (Ice Dancing)

International figure skating events
 January 20 – 26: 2020 European Figure Skating Championships in  Graz
 February 4 – 9: 2020 Four Continents Figure Skating Championships in  Seoul
 March 2 – 8: 2020 World Junior Figure Skating Championships in  Tallinn
 March 16 – 22: 2020 World Figure Skating Championships in  Montreal

2019–20 ISU Grand Prix of Figure Skating
 October 18 – 20, 2019: 2019 Skate America in  Las Vegas
 Men's winner:  Nathan Chen
 Ladies' winner:  Anna Shcherbakova
 Pairs winners:  (Peng Cheng & Jin Yang)
 Ice Dance winners:  (Madison Hubbell & Zachary Donohue)
 October 25 – 27, 2019: 2019 Skate Canada International in  Kelowna
 Men's winner:  Yuzuru Hanyu
 Ladies' winner:  Alexandra Trusova
 Pairs winners:  (Aleksandra Boikova & Dmitrii Kozlovskii)
 Ice Dance winners:  (Piper Gilles & Paul Poirier)
 November 1 – 3, 2019: 2019 Internationaux de France in  Grenoble
 Men's winner:  Nathan Chen
 Ladies' winner:  Alena Kostornaia
 Pairs winners:  (Anastasia Mishina & Aleksandr Galliamov)
 Ice Dance winners:  (Gabriella Papadakis & Guillaume Cizeron)
 November 8 – 10, 2019: 2019 Cup of China in  Chongqing
 Men's winner:  Jin Boyang
 Ladies' winner:  Anna Shcherbakova
 Pairs winners:  (Sui Wenjing & Han Cong)
 Ice Dance winners:  (Victoria Sinitsina & Nikita Katsalapov)
 November 15 – 17, 2019: 2019 Rostelecom Cup in  Moscow
 Men's winner:  Alexander Samarin
 Ladies' winner:  Alexandra Trusova
 Pairs winners:  (Aleksandra Boikova & Dmitrii Kozlovskii)
 Ice Dance winners:  (Victoria Sinitsina & Nikita Katsalapov)
 November 22 – 24, 2019: 2019 NHK Trophy in  Sapporo
 Men's winner:  Yuzuru Hanyu
 Ladies' winner:  Alena Kostornaia
 Pairs winners:  (Sui Wenjing & Han Cong)
 Ice Dance winners:  (Gabriella Papadakis & Guillaume Cizeron)
 December 5 – 8, 2019: 2019–20 Grand Prix of Figure Skating Final in  Turin
 Men's winner:  Nathan Chen
 Ladies' winner:  Alena Kostornaia
 Pairs winners:  (Sui Wenjing & Han Cong)
 Ice Dance winners:  (Gabriella Papadakis & Guillaume Cizeron)

2019–20 ISU Junior Grand Prix of Figure Skating
 August 21 – 24, 2019: JGP #1 in  Courchevel
 Note: There was no junior pairs event here.
 Junior Men's winner:  Yuma Kagiyama
 Junior Ladies' winner:  Kamila Valieva
 Junior Ice Dance winners:  (Elizaveta Shanaeva & Devid Naryzhnyy)
 August 28 – 31, 2019: JGP #2 in  Lake Placid
 Junior Men's winner:  Shun Sato
 Junior Ladies' winner:  Alysa Liu
 Junior Pairs winners:  (Apollinariia Panfilova & Dmitry Rylov)
 Junior Ice Dance winners:  (Avonley Nguyen & Vadym Kolesnik)
 September 4 – 7, 2019: JGP #3 in  Riga
 Note: There was no junior pairs event here.
 Junior Men's winner:  Andrei Mozalev
 Junior Ladies' winner:  Lee Hae-in
 Junior Ice Dance winners:  (Elizaveta Khudaiberdieva & Andrey Filatov)
 September 11 – 14, 2019: JGP #4 in  Chelyabinsk
 Junior Men's winner:  Petr Gumennik
 Junior Ladies' winner:  Kamila Valieva
 Junior Pairs winners:  (Kseniia Akhanteva & Valerii Kolesov)
 Junior Ice Dance winners:  (Elizaveta Shanaeva & Devid Naryzhnyy)
 September 18 – 21, 2019: JGP #5 in  Gdańsk
 Junior Men's winner:  Daniil Samsonov
 Junior Ladies' winner:  Alysa Liu
 Junior Pairs winners:  (Apollinariia Panfilova & Dmitry Rylov)
 Junior Ice Dance winners:  (Avonley Nguyen & Vadym Kolesnik)
 September 25 – 28, 2019: JGP #6 in  Zagreb
 Junior Men's winner:  Andrei Mozalev
 Junior Ladies' winner:  Lee Hae-in
 Junior Pairs winners:  (Iuliia Artemeva & Mikhail Nazarychev)
 Junior Ice Dance winners:  (Maria Kazakova & Georgy Reviya)
 October 2 – 5, 2019: JGP #7 in  Egna
 Note: There was no junior pairs event here.
 Junior Men's winner:  Daniel Grassl
 Junior Ladies' winner:  Ksenia Sinitsyna
 Junior Ice Dance winners:  (Elizaveta Khudaiberdieva & Andrey Filatov)
 December 5 – 8, 2019: 2019–20 Grand Prix of Figure Skating Final in  Turin
 Junior Men's winner:  Shun Sato
 Junior Ladies' winner:  Kamila Valieva
 Junior Pairs winners:  (Apollinariia Panfilova & Dmitry Rylov)
 Junior Ice Dance winners:  (Maria Kazakova & Georgy Reviya)

Floorball
 Men's World Floorball Championships – postponed to 2021
 Women's under-19 World Floorball Championships – postponed to 2021
 Champions Cup
 Men's champion:  Storvreta IBK
 Women's champion:  Täby FC

Freestyle skiing

Futsal

International futsal events
 July 19 – 26: 2020 World University Futsal Championships in  Poznań

FIFA (futsal)
 September 12 – October 4: 2020 FIFA Futsal World Cup in

UEFA (futsal)
 TBA: 2019–20 UEFA Futsal Champions League Finals in (location TBA)

CONMEBOL (futsal)
National teams
 TBA: 2019 Copa América de Futsal (location TBA)
 TBA: 2019 Copa América Femenina de Futsal (location TBA)

Clubs
 TBA: 2019 Copa Libertadores de Futsal
 TBA: 2019 Copa Libertadores Femenina de Futsal

AFC (futsal)
 February 27 – March 8: 2020 AFC Futsal Championship (location TBA)
 July 3 – 12: 2020 AFC Women's Futsal Championship (location TBA)

CAF (futsal)
 April: 2020 Africa Futsal Cup of Nations  in

Golf

2020 Summer Olympics (Golf)
Postponed to 2021

2020 Men's major golf championships
Three of the four major championships were rescheduled due to the COVID-19 pandemic, and one was canceled.
 July 16 – 19: 2020 Open Championship
Canceled; the planned site of  Royal St George's Golf Club in Sandwich, Kent will instead host in 2021
 August 6 – 9 (originally May 14 – 17): 2020 PGA Championship in  San Francisco
 Winner:  Collin Morikawa (1st major title, & 3rd PGA Tour win)
 September 17 – 20 (originally June 18 – 21): 2020 U.S. Open in  Mamaroneck
 November 12 – 15 (originally April 9 – 12): 2020 Masters Tournament in  Augusta

2020 World Golf Championships (WGC)
One of the four championships was rescheduled due to the pandemic, and one was canceled.
 February 21– 24: 2020 WGC-Mexico Championship in  Mexico City
 Winner:  Patrick Reed (second WGC-Mexico Championship win, 8th PGA Tour win)
 March 27 – 31: 2020 WGC-Dell Technologies Match Play in  Austin
Canceled
 July 25 – 28 (originally July 2 – 5): 2020 WGC-FedEx St. Jude Invitational in  Memphis
 TBA: 2020 WGC-HSBC Champions (location TBA)

2020 Women's major golf championships
Three of the five major championships were rescheduled due to the pandemic.
 June 25 – 28: 2020 Women's PGA Championship in  Newtown Township, Delaware County, Pennsylvania
 August 6 – 9 (originally July 23 – 26): 2020 Evian Championship in  Évian-les-Bains
Canceled
 August 20 – 23: 2020 Women's British Open in  Troon
 September 10 – 13 (originally April 2 – 5): 2020 ANA Inspiration in  Rancho Mirage, California
 December 10 – 13 (originally June 4 – 7): 2020 U.S. Women's Open in  Houston

2020 Senior major golf championships
Two of the five major championships were canceled due to the pandemic.
 May 21 – 24: Senior PGA Championship in  Benton Harbor, Michigan
Canceled
 June 25 – 28: U.S. Senior Open in  Newport, Rhode Island
Canceled
 July 9 – 12: Senior Players Championship in  Akron, Ohio
 July 23 – 26: Senior Open Championship in  Sunningdale
 September 24 – 27 (originally May 7 – 10): Regions Tradition in  Birmingham, Alabama

2020 Legends Tour (Senior women's major golf championships)
One of the two major championships were canceled due to the pandemic.
 July 9 – 12: U.S. Senior Women's Open in  Fairfield, Connecticut
 July 30 – August 1: Senior LPGA Championship in  French Lick, Indiana
Canceled

Other major professional golf events
 March 12 – 15: 2020 Players Championship in  Ponte Vedra Beach, Florida
Canceled following the conclusion of the first round
 September 10 – 13: 2020 BMW PGA Championship in  Virginia Water
 September 25 – 27: 2020 Ryder Cup in  Haven, Wisconsin

Major amateur golf events
June 12–14: 2020 Curtis Cup in  Conwy
Postponed until 2021
 August 3–9: 2020 U.S. Women's Amateur in  Rockville, Maryland
 August 10–16: 2020 U.S. Amateur in  Bandon, Oregon
 August 24–29: (originally June 15–20): 2020 Amateur Championship in  Southport, Lancashire
 August 24–29: (originally June 23–27): 2020 British Ladies Amateur in  Kilmarnock, East Ayrshire
 TBA: 2020 World Amateur Team Championships in

Gymnastics

2020 Summer Olympics (Gymnastics)

Acrobatic gymnastics
 May 29 – 31: 2020 FIG Acrobatic Gymnastics World Championships in  Geneva

Aerobic gymnastics
 May 14 – 16: 2020 FIG Aerobic Gymnastics World Championships in  Baku

Artistic gymnastics

 February 13 – 16: FIG World Cup 2020 (AG #1) in  Melbourne
 March 7: American Cup All-Around (FIG World Cup 2020 (IAA #1)) in  Milwaukee
 March 12 – 15: FIG World Cup 2020 (AG #2) in  Baku
 March 21 & 22: EnBW DTB-Pokal Individual All-Around (FIG World Cup 2020 (IAA #2)) in  Stuttgart
 March 25 – 28: FIG World Cup 2020 (AG #3) in  Doha
 March 28: FIG World Cup 2020 (IAA #3) in  Birmingham
 April 4 & 5: FIG World Cup 2020 (IAA #4) in  Tokyo

Rhythmic gymnastics

 April 3 – 5: FIG World Cup 2020 (RG #1) in  Pesaro
 April 10 – 12: FIG World Cup 2020 (RG #2) in  Sofia
 April 17 – 19: FIG World Cup 2020 (RG #3) in  Tashkent
 April 24 – 26: FIG World Cup 2020 (RG #4) in  Baku
 May 2 & 3: RG International Tournament - RITAM CUP 2020 in  Belgrade

Trampolining & Tumbling
 February 15 & 16: FIG TRA World Cup 2020 #1 in  Baku
 March 14 & 15: Dutch Trampoline Open 2020 in  Alkmaar
 April 24 & 25: FIG TRA World Cup 2020 #2 in  Brescia
 July 3 & 4: FIG TRA World Cup 2020 #3 in  Arosa

Handball

2020 Summer Olympics (Handball)

International handball events
 June 15 – 21: 2020 World University Handball Championship in  Łódź

Continental handball championships
 In the final,  defeated , 22–20, to win their 2nd European Men's Handball Championship title.
  took third place.
 December 3 – 20: 2020 European Women's Handball Championship in 
 In the final,  defeated , 22–20, to win their 8th European Women's Handball Championship title.
  took third place.

EHF
 September 11, 2019 – May 31: 2019–20 EHF Champions League
 In the final,  THW Kiel defeated  Barça, 33–28, to win their 4th EHF Champions League title.
  Paris Saint-Germain took third place.
 September 7, 2019 – May 10: 2019–20 Women's EHF Champions League
 August 31, 2019 – May 24: 2019–20 EHF Cup
 September 7, 2019 – May 10: 2019–20 Women's EHF Cup
 October 5, 2019 – May 24: 2019–20 EHF Challenge Cup
 November 9, 2019 – May 10: 2019–20 Women's EHF Challenge Cup

Other competitions
 August 30, 2019 –: 2019–2020 MOL Liga
 September 3, 2019 – April 4: 2019–20 SEHA League
 In the final,  Telekom Veszprém defeated  Vardar 1961, 35–27, to win their 3rd SEHA League title.
  Meshkov Brest took third place.
 September 7, 2019 –: 2019–2020 BeNe League
 September 22, 2019 –: 2019–2020 Baltic Handball League

South and Central America
National teams
 January 21 – 25: 2020 South and Central American Men's Handball Championship in  Maringá
 Note: All teams mentioned above have qualified to compete at the 2021 World Men's Handball Championship.

Horse racing

United States
US Triple Crown

 June 20: 2020 Belmont Stakes at  Belmont Park.
 September 5: 2020 Kentucky Derby at  Churchill Downs.
 October 3: 2020 Preakness Stakes at  Pimlico.

Breeders' Cup

 Nov 6–7: 2020 Breeders' Cup at  Churchill Downs.

United Kingdom

British Classic Races
 TBA: 2020 2,000 Guineas at  Newmarket
 TBA: 2020 1,000 Guineas at  Newmarket
 TBA: 2020 Epsom Oaks at  Epsom
 TBA: 2020 Epsom Derby at  Epsom
 September 12: 2020 St Leger at  Doncaster

Ice hockey

2020 Winter Youth Olympics (Ice hockey)
 January 10 – 22: Ice hockey at the 2020 Winter Youth Olympics in  Lausanne

Main world ice hockey championships
 December 26, 2019 – January 2, 2020: 2020 IIHF World Women's U18 Championship in  Bratislava
  defeated , 2–1 in overtime, to win their eighth IIHF World Women's U18 Championship title.
  took third place.
 December 26, 2019 – January 5, 2020: 2020 World Junior Ice Hockey Championships in  Ostrava & Třinec
  defeated , 4–3, to win their eighteenth World Junior Ice Hockey Championship title.
  took third place.
 March 31 – April 10: 2020 IIHF Women's World Championship in  Halifax & Truro
 April 16 – 26: 2020 IIHF World U18 Championships in  Ann Arbor & Plymouth
 May 8 – 24: 2020 IIHF World Championship in  Zürich & Lausanne

2020 IIHF Ice Hockey World Championships Divisions
 March 2 – 8: 2020 IIHF World Championship Division IV in  Bishkek
 April 19 – 25: Division II – Group A in  Zagreb
 April 19 – 25: Division II – Group B in  Reykjavík
 April 19 – 25: Division III – Group A in  Kockelscheuer
 April 20 – 26: Division III – Group B in  Cape Town
 April 24 – 30: Division I – Group A in  Ljubljana
 April 26 – May 2: Division I – Group B in  Katowice

2020 IIHF World U20 Championships (Junior) Divisions
 December 8 – 14, 2019: Division I – Group A in  Minsk
 Final Round Robin Ranking: 1. , 2. , 3. , 4. , 5. , 6. 
 Austria was promoted to Top Division for 2021. Slovenia was relegated to Division I – Group B for 2021.
 December 12 – 18, 2019: Division I – Group B in  Kyiv
 Final Round Robin Ranking: 1. , 2. , 3. , 4. , 5. , 6. 
 Hungary was promoted to Division I – Group A for 2021. Italy was relegated to Division II – Group A for 2021.
 January 6 – 12: Division II – Group A in  Vilnius
 Final Round Robin Ranking: 1. , 2. , 3. , 4. , 5. , 6. 
 Japan was promoted to Division I – Group B for 2021. Serbia was relegated to Division II – Group B for 2021.
 January 13 – 19: 2020 World Junior Ice Hockey Championships – Division III in  Sofia
 Final Round Robin Ranking: 1. , 2. , 3. , 4. , 5. , 6. , 7. , 8. 
 Iceland was promoted to Division II – Group B for 2021.
 January 28 – February 3: Division II – Group B in  Gangneung
 Final Round Robin Ranking: 1. , 2. , 3. , 4. , 5. , 6. 
 South Korea was promoted to Division II – Group A for 2021. Israel was relegated to Division III for 2021.

2020 IIHF World U18 Championships Divisions
 March 16 – 22: Division III – Group A in  Istanbul
 March 21 – 27: Division II – Group B in  Tianjin
 March 22 – 28: Division II – Group A in  Tallinn
 March 29 – April 4: Division III – Group B in  Kockelscheuer
 April 12 – 18: Division I – Group B in  Asiago
 April 13 – 19: Division I – Group A in  Piešťany

2020 IIHF Women's World Championships Divisions
 December 4 – 10, 2019: 2020 IIHF Women's World Championship Division III in  Sofia
 Final Round Robin Ranking: 1. , 2. , 3. , 4. , 5. , 6. 
 South Africa was promoted to Division II – Group B for 2021.
 February 23 – 29: Division II – Group B in  Akureyri
 Final Round Robin Ranking: 1. , 2. , 3. , 4. , 5. , 6. 
 Australia was promoted to Division II – Group A for 2021. Ukraine was relegated to Division III for 2021.
 March 28 – April 3: Division I – Group B in  Katowice
 March 29 – April 4: Division II – Group A in  Granada
 April 12 – 18: Division I – Group A in  Angers

2020 IIHF World Women's U18 Championships Divisions
 January 2 – 8: Division I – Group B in  Katowice
 Final Ranking: 1. , 2. , 3. , 4. , 5. , 6. 
 Norway was promoted to Division I – Group A for 2021. Great Britain was relegated to Division II – Group A for 2021.
 January 3 – 9: Division I – Group A in  Füssen
 Final Ranking: 1. , 2. , 3. , 4. , 5. , 6. 
 Germany was promoted to Top Division for 2021. Denmark was relegated to Division I – Group B for 2021.
 January 25 – 28: Division II – Group A in  Eindhoven
 Final Ranking: 1. , 2. , 3. , 4. 
 Chinese Taipei was promoted to Division I – Group B for 2021. Kazakhstan was relegated to Division II – Group B for 2021.
 January 30 – February 2: Division II – Group B in  Mexico City
 Final Ranking: 1. , 2. , 3. , 4. 
 Spain was promoted to Division II – Group A for 2021.

National Hockey League (NHL)
 October 2, 2019 – March 12, 2020: 2019–20 NHL season
 Presidents' Trophy and Eastern Conference winners:  Boston Bruins
 Western Conference winners:  St. Louis Blues
 Art Ross Trophy winner:  Leon Draisaitl ( Edmonton Oilers)
 October 4, 2019 – November 9, 2019: 2019 NHL Global Series
 Game #1 at the O2 Arena in  Prague
 The  Philadelphia Flyers defeated the  Chicago Blackhawks, with the score of 4–3.
 Games #2 & #3 at the Ericsson Globe in  Stockholm
 Game #2: The  Tampa Bay Lightning defeated the  Buffalo Sabres, with the score of 3–2.
 Game #3: The Tampa Bay Lightning defeated the Buffalo Sabres again, with the score of 5–3.
 October 26, 2019: 2019 Heritage Classic at the Mosaic Stadium in  Regina
 The  Winnipeg Jets defeated the  Calgary Flames, with the score of 2–1.
 January 1: 2020 NHL Winter Classic at the Cotton Bowl in  Dallas
 The  Dallas Stars defeated the  Nashville Predators, with the score of 4–2.
 January 24 – 26: 2020 National Hockey League All-Star Game (Weekend) at the Enterprise Center In  St. Louis
 February 15: 2020 NHL Stadium Series at the Falcon Stadium in  Colorado Springs
 The  Los Angeles Kings defeated the  Colorado Avalanche, with the score of 3–1.
 August 1 – September 28: 2020 Stanley Cup playoffs
 The  Tampa Bay Lightning defeated the  Dallas Stars, 4–2 in games played, to win their second Stanley Cup championship.
 October 6 & 7: 2020 NHL Entry Draft

North America (Ice hockey)
 Note: The Canadian Women's Hockey League has ceased its operations and it is now defunct.

United States (AHL/ECHL/USHL)
 October 4, 2019 – April 11: 2019–20 AHL season
 October 11, 2019 – April 5: 2019–20 ECHL season
 TBA: 2019–20 USHL season

Junior (OHL/QMJHL/WHL)
 September 19, 2019 – March 21: 2019–20 QMJHL season
 September 19, 2019 – March 22: 2019–20 OHL season
 September 20, 2019 – March 22: 2019–20 WHL season

College (USA–NCAA–Division I)
 March 27 – April 11: 2020 NCAA Division I Men's Ice Hockey Tournament (Frozen Four at Little Caesars Arena in  Detroit)
 TBA: 2020 NCAA National Collegiate Women's Ice Hockey Tournament

Women (NWHL)
 October 19, 2019 – March 1, 2020: 2019–20 NWHL season
 November 2020 – March 2021: 2020–21 NWHL season

Europe (Ice hockey)
 August 29, 2019 – February 4, 2020: 2019–20 Champions Hockey League
  Frölunda HC defeated  Mountfield HK, 3–1, to win their second consecutive and fourth Champions Hockey League title.
  Djurgårdens IF and  Luleå HF finished in joint third place, as the losing semi-finalists.
 September 20, 2019 – January 12: 2019–20 IIHF Continental Cup
 Final Ranking: 1.  SønderjyskE Ishockey, 2.  Nottingham Panthers, 3.  HC Neman Grodno, 4.  KS Cracovia

Finland 

 September 2019 – March 2020: 2019–20 Liiga season
 7 September 2019 – 12 March 2020: 2019–20 Naisten Liiga season

Asia (Ice hockey)
 August 31, 2019 – February 16: 2019–20 Asia League Ice Hockey season
 February 22 – March 8: 2019–20 Asia League Ice Hockey Playoffs
 TBA: 2020 IIHF Ice Hockey Challenge Cup of Asia
 TBA: 2020 IIHF Ice Hockey U20 Challenge Cup of Asia
 TBA: 2020 IIHF Ice Hockey U20 Challenge Cup of Asia Division I
 TBA: 2020 IIHF Ice Hockey Women's Challenge Cup of Asia
 TBA: 2020 IIHF Ice Hockey Women's Challenge Cup of Asia Division I

Judo

Karate

Kickboxing

Lacrosse

International lacrosse events
 July 9 – 18: 2020 Men's U19 World Lacrosse Championship in  Limerick
 July 23 – August 1: 2020 European Lacrosse Championship in  Wrocław

National Lacrosse League
 November 29, 2019 – April 25, 2020: 2020 NLL season

Luge

Modern pentathlon

International modern pentathlon events
 July 7 – 11: 2020 World University Modern Pentathlon Championships in  Vila Real

Motorsport

2020 Blancpain GT World Challenge Europe

2020 Formula One World Championship
 July 3–5: 2020 Austrian Grand Prix in  Spielberg
 Winner:  Valtteri Bottas ( Mercedes)
 July 12: 2020 Styrian Grand Prix in  Spielberg
 Winner:  Lewis Hamilton ( Mercedes)

2020 Formula 2 Championship
 July 4 & 5: 2020 Spielberg Formula 2 round in  Spielberg
 Feature Race winner:  Callum Ilott ( UNI-Virtuosi)
 Sprint Race winner:  Felipe Drugovich ( MP Motorsport)
 July 11 & 12: 2020 2nd Spielberg Formula 2 round in  Spielberg
 Feature Race winner:  Robert Shwartzman ( Prema Racing)
 Sprint Race winner:  Christian Lundgaard ( ART Grand Prix)
 July 18 & 19: 2020 Hungaroring Formula 2 round in  Hungaroring
 Feature Race winner:  Robert Shwartzmnan ( Prema Racing)

2020 FIA Formula 3 Championship
 July 4 & 5: 2020 Spielberg Formula 3 round in  Spielberg
 Race #1 winner:  Oscar Piastri ( Prema Racing)
 Race #2 winner:  Liam Lawson ( Hitech Grand Prix)
 July 11 & 12: 2020 2nd Spielberg Formula 3 round in  Spielberg
 Race #1 winner:  Frederik Vesti ( Prema Racing)
 Race #2 winner:  Théo Pourchaire ( ART Grand Prix)
 July 18 & 19: 2020 Hungaroring Formula 3 round in  Hungaroring
 Race #1 winner:  Théo Pourchaire ( ART Grand Prix)

2019–20 Formula E season
 November 21 – 23, 2019:  2019 Diriyah ePrix
 Winner #1:  Sam Bird
 Winner #2:  Alexander Sims
 January 18:  2020 Santiago ePrix
 Winner:  Maximilian Günther
 February 18:  2020 Mexico City ePrix
 Winner:  Mitch Evans
 February 29:  2020 Marrakesh ePrix
 Winner:  António Félix da Costa

2019–20 FIA World Endurance Championship
 September 1, 2019:  2019 FIA WEC 4 Hours of Silverstone
 LMP1 Winners:  No. 7 Toyota Gazoo Racing
 LMP2 Winners:  No. 42 Cool Racing
 LMGTE Pro Winners:  No. 91 Porsche GT Team
 LMGTE Am Winners:  No. 83 AF Corse
 October 6, 2019:  2019 6 Hours of Fuji
 LMP1 Winners:  No. 7 Toyota Gazoo Racing
 LMP2 Winners:  No. 29 Racing Team Nederland
 LMGTE Pro Winners:  No. 95 Aston Martin Racing
 LMGTE Am Winners:  No. 90 TF Sport
 November 10, 2019:  2019 4 Hours of Shanghai
 LMP1 Winners:  No. 1 Rebellion Racing
 LMP2 Winners:  No. 38 Jota Sport
 LMGTE Pro Winners:  No. 92 Porsche GT Team
 LMGTE Am Winners:  No. 90 TF Sport
 December 14, 2019:  2019 8 Hours of Bahrain
 LMP1 Winners:  No. 7 Toyota Gazoo Racing
 LMP2 Winners:  No. 22 United Autosports
 LMGTE Pro Winners:  No. 95 Aston Martin Racing
 LMGTE Am Winners:  No. 57 Team Project 1
 February 23:  2020 Lone Star Le Mans
 LMP1 Winners:  No. 1 Rebellion Racing
 LMP2 Winners:  No. 22 United Autosports
 LMGTE Pro Winners:  No. 95 Aston Martin Racing
 LMGTE Am Winners:  No. 90 TF Sport

Dakar Rally
 January 5 – 17: 2020 Dakar Rally in 
 Bikes winner:  Ricky Brabec (Monster Energy Honda Team)
 Cars winner:  Carlos Sainz (Bahrain JCW X-Raid Team)
 Quads winner:  Ignacio Casale (Casale Racing)
 SxS winner:  Casey Currie (Monster Energy Can-Am)
 Trucks winner:  Andrey Karginov (Kamaz-Master)

Muay Thai

Multi-sport events
 January 9 – 22: 2020 Winter Youth Olympics in  Lausanne
  &  won 10 Olympic gold medals each.
 Russia won the overall medal tally.
 March 15 – 21: 2020 Arctic Winter Games in / Whitehorse
 July 12 – 18: 2020 North American Indigenous Games in / Halifax

Nordic combined

Orienteering

Pickleball
 July 3: Bainbridge Cup cancelled due to COVID-19 pandemic. English Open Pickleball Tournament also cancelled.
 2020 Margaritaville USA Pickleball National Championships in Indian Wells, California – Cancelled "due to on-going concerns from the COVID-19 pandemic".

Racquetball

Men’s Professional International Racquetball Tour
 September 5–8, 2019: The Atlanta Open in  Lilburn
 Singles:  Rocky Carson defeated  Andree Parrilla, 15–13, 15–8.
 Doubles: Not played.
 September 19–22, 2019: The Valentine Open in  Laurel
 Singles:  Kane Waselenchuk defeated  Rocky Carson, 15-(-1), 11–15, 11–4.
 Doubles: Not played.
 October 2–6, 2019: US Open Racquetball Championships in  Minneapolis
 Singles:  Kane Waselenchuk defeated  Conrrado Moscoso, 15–12, 15–5.
 Doubles:  Kane Waselenchuk &  Ben Croft defeated  Daniel de la Rosa &  Álvaro Beltrán, 15–11, 15–8.
 October 24–27, 2019: Arizona IRT Pro Am Racquetball in  Tempe
 Singles:  Kane Waselenchuk defeated  Alejandro Landa, 15–4, 15–7.
 Doubles: Not played.
 October 31 – November 3, 2019: Los Compadres Auto Sales Open in  Fullerton
 Singles:  Alejandro Landa defeated  Rocky Carson, 9–15, 15–14, 11–10.
 Doubles:  Daniel de la Rosa &  Álvaro Beltrán defeated  Carlos Keller Vargas &  Conrrado Moscoso, 15–12, 15–8.
 December 5–8, 2019: SPC John A. Pelham Memorial Tournament of Champions in  Portland
 Singles:  Kane Waselenchuk defeated  Alejandro Landa, 15–7, 15–8.
 Doubles: Not played.

Ladies Professional Racquetball Tour
 August 23–25, 2019: Paola Longoria Experience in  San Luis Potosí
 Singles:  Paola Longoria defeated  María José Vargas, 15–13, 15–6.
 Doubles:  Monserrat Mejía &  Alexandra Herrera defeated  Samantha Salas &  Paola Longoria, 12–15, 15–10, 11–7.
 September 6–8, 2019: Chesapeake LPRT in  Virginia Beach
 Singles:  María José Vargas defeated  Paola Longoria, 7–15, 15–12, 11–4.
 Doubles:  Samantha Salas &  Paola Longoria defeated  Natalia Méndez &  María José Vargas, 15–6, 15–11.
 October 2–6, 2019: US Open Racquetball Championships in  Minneapolis
 Singles:  Paola Longoria defeated  María José Vargas, 15–5, 15–7.
 Doubles:  Monserrat Mejía &  Alexandra Herrera defeated  Samantha Salas &  Paola Longoria, 15–13, 15–12.
 November 22–24, 2019: LPRT Pro Am Turkey Shoot in  Lombard
 Singles:  Paola Longoria defeated  Monserrat Mejía, 15–2, 15–6.
 Doubles:  Samantha Salas &  Paola Longoria defeated  Monserrat Mejía &  Alexandra Herrera, 4–15, 15–10, 11–7.
 December 13–15, 2019: LPRT Christmas Classic Pro-AM in  Laurel
 Singles:  Paola Longoria defeated  María José Vargas, 3–15, 15–8, 11–8.
 Doubles:  Samantha Salas &  Paola Longoria defeated  Natalia Méndez &  María José Vargas, 12–15, 15–11, 11–4.

Roller sport

2020 Summer Olympics (Skateboarding)
 March 16 – 22: World Skate Lima Open Street & Park - Tokyo 2020 Qualification Event SEASON #2 in  Lima
 April 6 – 12: ISO Yangcheng Street and Park 2020 - 5 STAR Tokyo 2020 Qualification Event SEASON #2 in  Yancheng
 April 14 – 19: ISO Nanjing Street 2020 - 5 STAR - Tokyo 2020 Qualification Event SEASON #2 in  Nanjing
 April 22 – 26: ARK League - Street - 5 STAR -Tokyo 2020 Qualification Event SEASON #2 in  Samukawa
 May 4 – 10: Dew Tour 2020 5 Star Street, Pro Tour Park - Tokyo 2020 Qualification Event SEASON #2 in  Long Beach
 May 19 – 24: World Skate SLS World Championship 2020 - Tokyo 2020 Qualification Event SEASON #2 in  London
 May 26 – 31: Park World Championship 2020 - Tokyo 2020 Qualification Event SEASON #2 in  Nanjing

World and continental championships

World Skate Europe
 October 19, 2019 – May 17: 2019–20 Rink Hockey Euroleague
 October 26, 2019 – April 5: 2019–20 Rink Hockey European Female League
 October, 2019 – 2019–20 World Skate Europe Cup

FIRS
Artistic
 January 16 – 20: Americas Cup Championship of Clubs in  Orlando
 May 4 – 10: Portugal Cup in  Sines
 May 18 – 24: Sedmak Cup in  Trieste
 June 2 – 6: 2020 Artistic World Cup Final in  Bremerhaven
 June 6 – 14: Filippini International 2020 - World Skate 23rd edition in  Misano Adriatico

Inline freestyle
 August 27 – 30: Inline Freestyle World Championships in  Shanghai

Inline Hockey
 June 28 – July 11: 2020 FIRS Inline Hockey World Championships in  Cartagena

Skate Cross
 August 27 – 30: Skate Cross World Championship in  Shanghai

Speed
 March 22: 2020 World Skate Lima Open Marathon in  Lima
 July 11 – 18: 2020 Inline Speed Skating World Championship in  Cartagena & Arjona
 September 30 – October 10: 2020 Artistic Skating World Championships in  Asunción

Oceania Skate
 April 10 – 15: 2020 World Skate Oceania Speed Championships in  Timaru

Rowing

2020 Summer Olympics (Rowing)
 April 2 – 5: 2020 FISA Americas Olympic Qualification Regatta in  Rio de Janeiro
 April 27 – 29: 2020 FISA European Olympic Qualification Regatta in  Varese
 April 27 – 30: 2020 FISA Asia & Oceania Olympic Qualification Regatta in  Chungju
 May 17 – 19: 2020 FISA Final Olympic Qualification Regatta in  Lucerne

2020 Summer Paralympics (Rowing)
 May 8 – 10: 2020 FISA Final Paralympic Qualification Regatta in  Gavirate

Rugby league

 2020 NRL season in Australasia
 Super League XXV in Europe
 June 19: 2020 Sunshine Coast Gympie Rugby League season is cancelled with only three top division clubs nominating teams.

Rugby sevens

2019–20 World Rugby Sevens Series
 December 5–7, 2019: 2019 Dubai Sevens in 
 Winner: ; 2nd place: ; 3rd place: 
 December 13–15, 2019: 2019 South Africa Sevens in  Cape Town
 Winner: ; 2nd place: ; 3rd place:

2019–20 World Rugby Women's Sevens Series
 October 5–6, 2019: 2019 USA Women's Sevens
 Winner: ; 2nd place: ; 3rd place: 
 December 5–7, 2019: 2019 Dubai Women's Sevens in 
 Winner: ; 2nd place: ; 3rd place: 
 December 13–15, 2019: 2019 South Africa Women's Sevens in  Cape Town
 Winner: ; 2nd place: ; 3rd place:

International rugby sevens events
 September 17 – 19: 2020 World University Rugby Sevens Championships in  La Plata

Rugby union

World Rugby
 September 27, 2019 – June 20: 2019–20 Pro14
 February 1 – March 14: 2020 Six Nations Championship
 February 2 – March 15: 2020 Women's Six Nations Championship

Rugby Europe
 November 15, 2019 – May 23: 2019–20 European Rugby Champions Cup
 November 15, 2019 – May 22: 2019–20 European Rugby Challenge Cup
 September, 2019 – June: 2019–20 Rugby Europe International Championships
 October 26, 2019 – May 17: 2019–20 Rugby Europe Trophy
 February 1 – March 16: 2020 Rugby Europe Championship
 March 1 – April 11: 2019–20 Rugby Europe Women Championship
 October 5, 2019 – 2020: 2019–20 Rugby Europe Women Trophy

Asia Rugby
 August 8 & 9: Asia Rugby Men's Sevens Trophy and Asia Rugby Women's Sevens Trophy in  Jakarta
 August 29 & 30: Asia Rugby Under 20 Men's Sevens and Asia Rugby Under 20 Women's Sevens in  Johor Bahru
 August 29 – September 27: 2020 Asia Rugby Sevens Series in  Incheon,  Huizhou,  Colombo

Rugby Africa
 November 23, 2019 – 2019-20 Rugby Africa Cup

Americas Rugby
 August 15 – September 12: 2020 Americas Rugby Championship
 August 22 – 30: 2020 Americas Rugby Challenge

Sailing

Shooting sports

2020 Summer Olympics (Shooting)
 April 15 – 27: All Guns Olympic Test Event in  Tokyo

2020 Summer Paralympics (Shooting)
 August 31 – September 6: Shooting at the 2020 Summer Paralympics in  Tokyo

World and continental shooting events
 February 23 – March 3: 2020 10m European Shooting Championships in  Wrocław
 May 6 – 20: 2020 European Shotgun Championships in  Châteauroux
 September 9 – 13: 2020 World University Shooting Championships in  Plzeň

2020 ISSF World Cup
 March 4 – 13: Shotgun World Cup #1 in  Nicosia
 March 15 – 26: All Guns World Cup #1 in  New Delhi
 June 2 – 9: Rifle and Pistol World Cup #1 in  Munich
 June 22 – July 3: All Guns World Cup #2 in  Baku

Ski jumping

Ski mountaineering

Snooker

Snowboarding

Softball

Speed skating

2020 Winter Youth Olympics (Speed skating)
 January 12 – 16: Speed skating at the 2020 Winter Youth Olympics in  St. Moritz
 January 18 – 22: Short track speed skating at the 2020 Winter Youth Olympics in  Lausanne

2019–20 ISU Speed Skating World Cup
 November 15 – 17, 2019: SSWC #1 in  Minsk
 500 m winners:  Kim Jun-ho (m) /  Olga Fatkulina (f)
 1000 m winners:  Thomas Krol (m) /  Brittany Bowe (f)
 1500 m winners:  Kjeld Nuis (m) /  Ireen Wüst (f)
 Men's 5000 m winner:  Patrick Roest
 Women's 3000 m winner:  Isabelle Weidemann
 Mass Start winners:  Jorrit Bergsma (m) /  Ivanie Blondin (f)
 Team sprint winners:  (Ronald Mulder, Kjeld Nuis, Kai Verbij) (m) /  (Michelle de Jong, Jutta Leerdam, Letitia de Jong)
 November 22 – 24, 2019: SSWC #2 in  Tomaszów Mazowiecki
 500 m winners:  Tatsuya Shinhama (m) /  Nao Kodaira (f)
 1500 m winners:  Thomas Krol (m) /  Ireen Wüst (f)
 Men's 5000 m winner:  Patrick Roest
 Women's 3000 m winner:  Martina Sáblíková
 Mass Start winners:  Joey Mantia (m) /  Irene Schouten (f)
 Team Pursuit winners:  (Douwe de Vries, Jan Blokhuijsen, Patrick Roest, Marcel Bosker) /  (Yekaterina Shikhova, Natalya Voronina, Elizaveta Kazelina, Evgeniia Lalenkova)
 Team sprint winners:  (Ronald Mulder, Kjeld Nuis, Thomas Krol, Lennart Velema) /  (Olga Fatkulina, Angelina Golikova, Daria Kachanova, Irina Kuznetsova)
 December 6 – 8, 2019: SSWC #3 in  Nur-Sultan
 500 m winners:  Viktor Mushtakov (m) /  Angelina Golikova (f)
 1000 m winners:  Thomas Krol (m) /  Brittany Bowe (f)
 1500 m winners:  Zhongyan Ning (m) /  Ivanie Blondin (f)
 Men's 10000 m winner:  Patrick Roest
 Women's 5000 m winner:  Ivanie Blondin
 Team Pursuit winners:  (Andrea Giovannini, Nicola Tumolero, Michele Malfatti, Alessio Trentini) /  (Ivanie Blondin, Isabelle Weidemann, Béatrice Lamarche, Valérie Maltais)
 Team sprint winners:  (Ronald Mulder, Kjeld Nuis, Kai Verbij, Thomas Krol) (m) /  (Letitia de Jong, Sanneke de Neeling, Jutta Leerdam, Michelle de Jong)
 December 13 – 15, 2019: SSWC #4 in  Nagano
 1st 500 m winners:  Yuma Murakami (m) /  Nao Kodaira (f)
 2nd 500 m winners:  Viktor Mushtakov (m) /  Angelina Golikova (f)
 1000 m winners:  Pavel Kulizhnikov (m) /  Brittany Bowe (f)
 Men's 5000 m winner:  Danila Semerikov
 Women's 3000 m winner:  Ivanie Blondin
 Mass Start winners:  Jordan Belchos (m) /  Ivanie Blondin (f)
 Team Pursuit winners:  (Aleksandr Rumyantsev, Danila Semerikov, Ruslan Zakharov, Daniil Aldoshkin) /  (Miho Takagi, Nana Takagi, Ayano Sato, Nene Sakai)
 Team sprint winners:  (Pavel Kulizhnikov, Ruslan Murashov, Viktor Mushtakov, Artem Arefyev) (m) /  (Sanneke de Neeling, Dione Voskamp, Isabelle van Elst, Michelle de Jong)
 February 7 & 8: SSWC #5 in  Calgary
 March 7 & 8: SSWC #6 (final) in  Heerenveen

Other long track speed skating events
 January 10 – 12: 2020 European Speed Skating Championships in  Heerenveen
 January 31 – February 2: 2020 Four Continents Speed Skating Championships in  Milwaukee (debut event)
 February 13 – 16: 2020 World Single Distance Speed Skating Championships in  Salt Lake City
 February 28 – March 1: 2020 World Sprint & World Allround Speed Skating Championships in  Hamar
 March 10 – 13: 2020 World University Speed Skating Championships in  Amsterdam

2019–20 ISU Short Track Speed Skating World Cup
 November 1 – 3, 2019: STWC #1 in  Salt Lake City
 Men's 500 m winners:  Hwang Dae-heon (#1) /  Wu Dajing (#2)
 Women's 500 m winners:  Martina Valcepina (#1) /  Kim Boutin (#2)
 1000 m winners:  Hwang Dae-heon (m) /  Suzanne Schulting
 1500 m winners:  Semion Elistratov (m) /  Kim Boutin (f)
 Men's 5000 m Relay winners:  (Daniil Eybog, Pavel Sitnikov, Semion Elistratov, & Viktor An)
 Women's 3000 m Relay winners:  (Fan Kexin, Han Yutong, Qu Chunyu, & ZHANG Yuting)
 Mixed 2000 m Relay winners:  (Daniil Eybog, Ekaterina Efremenkova, Sofia Prosvirnova, & Viktor An)
 November 8 – 10, 2019: STWC #2 in  Montreal
 500 m winners:  Shaolin Sándor Liu (m) /  Kim Boutin (f)
 Men's 1000 m winners:  Hwang Dae-heon (#1) /  Semion Elistratov (#2)
 Women's 1000 m winners:  Kim Boutin (#1) /  Han Yutong (#2)
 1500 m winners:  Park Ji-won (m) /  KIM Ji-yoo (f)
 Men's 5000 m Relay winners:  (Csaba Burján, Cole Krueger, Shaoang Liu, & Shaolin Sándor Liu)
 Women's 3000 m Relay winners:  (Fan Kexin, Qu Chunyu, ZANG Yize, & ZHANG Yuting)
 Mixed 2000 m Relay winners:  (Han Tianyu, Qu Chunyu, Ren Ziwei, & ZHANG Yuting)
 November 29 – December 1, 2019: STWC #3 in  Nagoya
 500 m winners:  Shaoang Liu (m) /  Kim Boutin (f)
 1000 m winners:  Park Ji-won (m) /  Noh Ah-reum (f)
 1st 1500 m winners:  Kim Dong-wook (m) /  Kim Ji-yoo (f)
 2nd 1500 m winners:  Park Ji-won (m) /  Suzanne Schulting (f)
 Men's 5000 m Relay winners:  (AN Kai, Han Tianyu, Ren Ziwei, Wu Dajing)
 Women's 3000 m Relay winners:  (Arianna Fontana, Cynthia Mascitto, Martina Valcepina, Nicole Botter Gomez)
 Mixed 2000 m Relay winners:  (Choi Min-jeong, Kim A-lang, Kim Dong-wook, Park In-wook)
 December 6 – 8, 2019: STWC #4 in  Shanghai
 1st 500 m winners:  Shaolin Sándor Liu (m) /  Kim Boutin (f)
 2nd 500 m winners:  Shaolin Sándor Liu (m) /  Fan Kexin (f)
 1000 m winners:  Han Tianyu (m) /  Suzanne Schulting (f)
 1500 m winners:  Lee June-seo (m) /  Kim A-lang (f)
 Men's 5000 m Relay winners:  (Daniil Eybog, Pavel Sitnikov, Semion Elistratov, Viktor An)
 Women's 3000 m Relay winners:  (Alyson Charles, Courtney Sarault, Danaé Blais, Kim Boutin)
 Mixed 2000 m Relay winners:  (Daan Breeuwsma, Itzhak de Laat, Lara van Ruijven, Suzanne Schulting)
 February 7 – 9: STWC #5 in  Dresden
 February 14 – 16: STWC #6 (final) in  Dordrecht

Other short track speed skating events
 January 10 – 12: 2020 Four Continents Short Track Speed Skating Championships in  Montreal (debut event)
 January 24 – 26: 2020 European Short Track Speed Skating Championships in  Debrecen
 March 13 – 15: 2020 World Short Track Speed Skating Championships in  Seoul

Sport climbing

International sport climbing championships
 TBA: 2020 World University Sport Climbing Championships in  Turin

Squash

2019–20 PSA World Tour
World Tour Platinum
 October 5–12, 2019: United States Open in  Philadelphia
 Men:  Ali Farag defeated  Mohamed El Shorbagy, 11–4, 11–7, 11–2.
 Women:  Nouran Gohar defeated  Nour El Tayeb, 3–11, 8–11, 14–12, 11–8, 11–7.
 October 25 – November 1, 2019: Egyptian Squash Open in  Cairo
  Karim Abdel Gawad defeated  Ali Farag, 11–6, 11–8, 11–8.
 January 9 – 17: Tournament of Champions in  Manhattan

World Tour Gold
 September 4–8, 2019: China Squash Open in  Shanghai
 Men:  Mohamed El Shorbagy defeated  Ali Farag, 11–3, 11–9, 5–11, 11–8.
 Women:  Nour El Tayeb defeated  Raneem El Weleily, 11–9, 9–11, 11–9, 9–11, 12–10.
 September 24–30, 2019: Netsuite Open in  San Francisco
 Men:  Mohamed El Shorbagy defeated  Tarek Momen, 11–5, 11–13, 11–9, 7–11, 11–4.
 Women:  Raneem El Weleily defeated  Nour El Tayeb, 11–5, 11–5, 11–5.
 November 19–24, 2019: St George's Hill Open in  Weybridge
  Karim Abdel Gawad defeated  Mohamed El Shorbagy, 8–11, 11–3, 11–1, 10–12, 11–6.

World Tour Silver
 September 9–14, 2019: Open de France - Nantes in 
 Men:  Paul Coll defeated  Joel Makin, 12–10, 11–3, 11–9.
 Women:  Camille Serme defeated  Amanda Sobhy, 9–11, 11–6, 11–8, 11–9.

World Tour Bronze
 January 22 – 26: Pittsburgh Open in  Pittsburgh
 January 22 – 27: Carol Weymuller Open in  Brooklyn
 January 30 – February 3: Cleveland Classic in  Cleveland

World Championship
 October 24 – November 1, 2019: CIB PSA Women's World Championship in  Cairo
  Nour El Sherbini defeated  Raneem El Weleily, 11–4, 9–11, 11–5, 11–6.
 November 8–15, 2019: PSA Men's World Championship in  Doha
  Tarek Momen defeated  Paul Coll, 11–8, 11–3, 11–4.

Surfing

Table tennis

2020 Summer Olympics (Table tennis)
 April 6 – 12: Asian 2020 Olympic Qualification Tournament (location TBA)
 TBA: Latin American Singles and Mixed Qualification to Tokyo 2020 in  Havana

World table tennis events
Senior
 November 8 – 10: 2020 ITTF Women's World Cup in  Weihai
 November 13 – 15: 2020 ITTF Men's World Cup in  Weihai
 November 19 – 22: 2020 ITTF Finals in  Zhengzhou
 February 28 – March 7, 2021: 2020 World Team Table Tennis Championships in  Busan

Junior & Cadet
 November 29 – December 6: 2020 World Junior Table Tennis Championships in  Guimarães

Continental table tennis championships

Americas (TT)
Senior
 February 7 – 9: 2020 ITTF Pan-America Cup (location TBA)
 September 15 – 20: 2020 Pan American Table Tennis Championships (location TBA)

Junior & Cadet
 June 22 – 27: 2020 Pan American Junior Table Tennis Championships (location TBA)

Asia (TT)
Senior
 TBA: 2020 ITTF-ATTU Asian Cup (location TBA)

Junior & Cadet
 September 29 – October 4: 2020 Asian Junior & Cadet Table Tennis Championships (location TBA)

Europe (TT)
Senior
 February 8 & 9: 2020 Europe Top 16 Cup in  Montreux
 September 15 – 20: 2020 European Table Tennis Championships in  Warsaw

U-21, Junior & Cadet
 March 4 – 8: 2020 European Under-21 Table Tennis Championships in  Varaždin
 July 10 – 19: 2020 European Youth Table Tennis Championships in  Zagreb
 October 2 – 4: 2020 European Youth Top 10 in  Berlin

2020 ITTF World Tour

World Tour Platinum events
 January 28 – February 2: 2020 German Open in  Magdeburg
 March 3 – 8: 2020 Qatar Open in  Doha
 April 21 – 26: 2020 Japan Open in  Kitakyushu
 May 12 – 17: 2020 China Open in  Shenzhen
 June 23 – 28: 2020 Australian Open in  Geelong
 November 10 – 15: 2020 Austrian Open in  Linz

World Tour events
 February 18 – 23: 2020 Hungarian Open in  Budapest
 May 5 – 10: 2020 Hong Kong Open in 
 June 16 – 21: 2020 Korea Open (location TBA)
 August 25 – 30: 2020 Czech Open in  Olomouc
 September 1 – 6: 2020 Bulgarian Open in  Panagyurishte
 November 3 – 8: 2020 Swedish Open in  Stockholm

Grand Finals
 December 10 – 13: 2020 ITTF World Tour Grand Finals (location TBA)

2020 ITTF Challenge Series
Plus events
 February 12 – 16: Portugal Open in  Lisbon
 March 11 – 15: Oman Open in  Muscat
 June 3 – 7: Belarus Open in  Minsk
 August 18 – 22: Nigeria Open in  Lagos
 September 9 – 13: Pyongyang Open in 
 October 27 – 31: Belgian Open in  De Haan
 December 1 – 5: Canada Open in  Vancouver

Regular events
 February 4 – 8: Spanish Open in  Guadalajara
 March 11 – 15: Polish Open in  Gliwice
 April 1 – 5: Italian Open in  Riccione
 April 22 – 26: Slovenia Open in  Otočec
 April 28 – May 2: Croatia Open in  Zagreb
 April 29 – May 3: Thailand Open in  Bangkok
 June 9 – 13: Mexico Open in  Cancún

Taekwondo

Telemark skiing

Tennis

Grand Slam
January 13–26: 2020 Australian Open
 Men:  Novak Djokovic defeated  Dominic Thiem, 6–4, 4–6, 2–6, 6–3, 6–4.
 Women:  Sofia Kenin defeated  Garbiñe Muguruza, 4–6, 6–2, 6–2.
August 31–September 13: 2020 US Open
September 21–October 11: 2020 French Open
2020 Wimbledon Championships cancelled, and instead to be held the tournament in 2021.

2020 ATP World Tour

2020 WTA Tour
WTA Premier

WTA International

Triathlon

2020 Summer Olympics (Triathlon)
 May 9 & 10: 2020 Chengdu ITU Mixed Relay Olympic Qualification Event in

2020 ITU World Triathlon Series
 March 6 & 7: WTS #1 in  Abu Dhabi
 April 18 & 19: WTS #2 in 
 May 16 & 17: WTS #3 in  Yokohama
 June 6 & 7: WTS #4 in  Leeds
 June 27 & 28: WTS #5 in  Montreal
 July 11 & 12: WTS #6 in  Hamburg
 August 20 – 23: WTS Grand Final (#7) in  Edmonton

World triathlon championships
 May 2 & 3: 2020 Milan ITU Paratriathlon World Championships in 
 June 27 & 28: 2020 Kecskemét World University Triathlon Championships in 
 July 11 & 12: 2020 Hamburg ITU Triathlon Mixed Relay World Championships in 
 September 4 – 13: 2020 Almere-Amsterdam ITU Multisport World Championships in the

2020 ITU Triathlon World Cup
 March 14 & 15: TWC #1 in  Mooloolaba
 March 21 & 22: TWC #2 in  Sarasota
 March 28 & 29: TWC #3 in  New Plymouth
 April 4 & 5: TWC #4 in  Brasília
 April 25 & 26: TWC #5 in  Huatulco
 May 1 & 2: TWC #6 in  Valencia
 May 9 & 10: TWC #7 in  Chengdu
 May 30 & 31: TWC #8 in  Arzachena
 July 18 & 19: TWC #9 in  Tiszaújváros
 August 29 & 30: TWC #10 in  Karlovy Vary
 September 12 & 13: TWC #11 in  Weihai
 September 25 & 26: TWC #12 in  Madrid
 October 17 & 18: TWC #13 in  Tongyeong
 October 24 & 25: TWC #14 in  Miyazaki

2020 ITU World Triathlon Mixed Relay Series
 March 6 & 7: WTMRS #1 in  Abu Dhabi

2020 ITU World Paratriathlon Series
 February 29 & March 1: WPS #1 in  Devonport
 May 16 & 17: WPS #2 in  Yokohama
 June 20 & 21: WPS #3 (final) in  Montreal

2020 ITU Paratriathlon World Cup
 March 7 & 8: PWC #1 in  Abu Dhabi
 March 21 & 22: PWC #2 in  Sarasota
 June 13 & 14: PWC #3 in  Besançon
 October 3 & 4: PWC #4 in  Alanya

World Triathlon Corporation
Main Ironman Championships
 March 29: 2020 Ironman African Championship in  Nelson Mandela Bay Metropolitan Municipality
 June 7: 2020 Ironman Asia-Pacific Championship in  Cairns
 June 28: 2020 Ironman European Championship in  Frankfurt
 TBA: 2020 Ironman North American Championship in  The Woodlands
 TBA: 2020 Ironman South American Championship in  Mar del Plata
 TBA: 2020 Ironman World Championship in  Kailua-Kona

Main Ironman 70.3 Championships
 June 21: 2020 Ironman 70.3 European Championship in  Elsinore
 November 28: 2020 Ironman 70.3 World Championship in  Taupo
 TBA: 2020 Ironman 70.3 South American Championship (location TBA)
 TBA: 2020 Ironman 70.3 North American Championship (location TBA)
 TBA: 2020 Ironman 70.3 Asia-Pacific Championship (location TBA)
 TBA: 2020 Ironman 70.3 Middle East Championship (location TBA)

Volleyball

2020 Summer Olympics (Volleyball)
 April 21 – 26: 2020 Olympic Volleyball Test Events in  Tokyo

FIVB Challenger Cup
 June 24 – 28: 2020 FIVB Volleyball Challenger Cup for Men and Women in  Gondomar

FIVB Nations League
 May 19 – June 18: 2020 FIVB Volleyball Women's Nations League
 May 22 – June 21: 2020 FIVB Volleyball Men's Nations League

NORCECA
 January 10 – 12: 2020 NORCECA Men's Tokyo Volleyball Olympic Qualification in  Vancouver
 January 10 – 12: 2020 NORCECA Women's Tokyo Volleyball Olympic Qualification in  Santo Domingo

CSV
 January 7 – 9: 2020 CSV Women's Tokyo Volleyball Olympic Qualification in  Bogotá
 January 10 – 12: 2020 CSV Men's Tokyo Volleyball Olympic Qualification in  Santiago

CEV
Teams competitions
 January 5 – 10: 2020 CEV Men's Tokyo Volleyball Olympic Qualification in  Berlin
 January 7 – 12: 2020 CEV Women's Tokyo Volleyball Olympic Qualification in  Apeldoorn
 May 23 – June 21: 2020 CEV Men's Volleyball European Golden League (Final in  Kortrijk)
 May 23 – June 21: 2020 CEV Women's Volleyball European Golden League (Final in  Ruse)

Club competitions
 October 8, 2019 – May 17: 2019–20 CEV Women's Champions League
 October 22, 2019 – May 17: 2019–20 CEV Champions League

Other competitions
 October 2, 2019 – March 14: 2019–20 Baltic Men Volleyball League
 October 12, 2019 –: 2019–20 Baltic Women Volleyball League
 October 5, 2019 –: 2019–20 MEVZA League
 October 12, 2019 –: 2019–20 MEVZA Women League

AVC
 January 7 – 12: 2020 AVC Men's Tokyo Volleyball Olympic Qualification in  Jiangmen
 January 7 – 12: 2020 AVC Women's Tokyo Volleyball Olympic Qualification in  Nakhon Ratchasima

CAVB
 January 4 – 9: 2020 CAVB Women's Tokyo Volleyball Olympic Qualification in  Yaoundé
 January 6 – 12: 2020 CAVB Men's Tokyo Volleyball Olympic Qualification in  Cairo

Water polo

 March 22 – 29: 2020 Men's Water Polo Olympic Games Qualification Tournament in  Rotterdam

Water skiing & Wakeboarding

IWWF World Championships
 March 21 & 22: 2020 IWWF World Waterski Show Tournament in  Mulwala
 April 11 – 18: 2020 IWWF World Barefoot Waterski Championships in  Liverpool (Sydney)
 August 18 – 23: 2020 IWWF World Junior Waterski Championships in  Santa Rosa Beach, Florida
 September 14 – 20: 2020 IWWF World Cable Wakeboard Championships in  Pathum Thani
 September 14 – 20: 2020 IWWF World Over 35 Waterski Championships in  Baurech
 September 22 – 27: 2020 FISU World University Waterski & Wakeboard Championships in  Dnipro

Weightlifting

Wrestling

2020 Wrestling Continental Championships
 2020 Individual Wrestling World Cup in  Belgrade ⇒ 12–18 December
 2020 European Wrestling Championships in  Rome ⇒ 10–16 February
 2020 Asian Wrestling Championships in  New Delhi ⇒ 18–23 February
 2020 Pan American Wrestling Championships in  Ottawa ⇒ 6–9 March
 2020 African Wrestling Championships in  Algiers ⇒ 8–9 February
 2020 Pan American Wrestling Olympic Qualification Tournament in  Ottawa ⇒ 13–15 March

2020 Wrestling International Tournament
 2020 Yasar Dogu Tournament in  Istanbul ⇒ 10–12 January
 Golden Grand Prix Ivan Yarygin 2020 in  Krasnoyarsk ⇒ 23–26 January
 2020 Grand Prix Zagreb Open in  Zagreb ⇒ 7–8 November
 2020 Wladyslaw Pytlasinski Cup in  Warsaw ⇒ 7–8 November

Wushu

Notes

References

 
Sports by year